= Outline of category theory =

Overview of and topical guide to category theory

The following outline is provided as an overview of and guide to category theory:

Category theory is a general theory of mathematical structures and their relations. It was introduced by Samuel Eilenberg and Saunders Mac Lane in the mid-20th century in their foundational work on algebraic topology. Category theory can be used in most areas of mathematics. In particular, many constructions of new mathematical objects from previous ones that appear similarly in several contexts are conveniently expressed and unified in terms of categories. Examples include quotient spaces, direct products, completion, and duality.

Many areas of computer science also rely on category theory, such as functional programming and semantics.

== Essence of category theory ==
- Category
- Functor
- Natural transformation

== Branches of category theory ==
- Homological algebra
- Diagram chasing
- Topos theory
- Enriched category theory
- Higher category theory
- Categorical logic
- Applied category theory

== Specific categories ==
- Category of sets
  - Concrete category
- Category of small categories
- Category of vector spaces
  - Category of graded vector spaces
- Category of chain complexes
- Category of finite dimensional Hilbert spaces
- Category of sets and relations
- Category of topological spaces
- Category of metric spaces
- Category of preordered sets
- Category of groups
- Category of abelian groups
- Category of rings
- Category of magmas

== Objects ==
- Initial object
- Terminal object
- Zero object
- Subobject
- Group object
- Magma object
- Natural number object
- Exponential object

== Morphisms ==
- Epimorphism
- Monomorphism
- Zero morphism
- Normal morphism
- Dual (category theory)
- Groupoid
- Image (category theory)
- Coimage
- Commutative diagram
- Cartesian morphism
- Slice category

== Functors ==
- Isomorphism of categories
- Natural transformation
- Equivalence of categories
- Subcategory
- Faithful functor
- Full functor
- Forgetful functor
- Representable functor
- Functor category
- Adjoint functors
  - Galois connection
  - Pontryagin duality
  - Affine scheme
- Monad (category theory)
- Comonad
- Combinatorial species
- Exact functor
- Derived functor
- Dominant functor
- Enriched functor
- Kan extension of a functor
- Hom functor
  - Yoneda lemma

== Limits ==
- Product (category theory)
- Equaliser (mathematics)
- Kernel (category theory)
- Pullback (category theory)/fiber product
- Inverse limit
  - Pro-finite group
- Colimit
  - Coproduct
  - Coequalizer
  - Cokernel
  - Pushout (category theory)
  - Direct limit
- Biproduct
  - Direct sum

== Additive structure ==
- Preadditive category
- Additive category
- Pre-Abelian category
- Abelian category
  - Exact sequence
  - Exact functor
  - Snake lemma
    - Nine lemma
  - Five lemma
    - Short five lemma
  - Mitchell's embedding theorem
- Injective cogenerator
- Derived category
- Triangulated category
- Model category
- 2-category

== Dagger categories ==
- Dagger symmetric monoidal category
- Dagger compact category
- Strongly ribbon category

== Monoidal categories ==
- Closed monoidal category
- Braided monoidal category
- Symmetric monoidal category

== Structure ==
- Semigroupoid
- Comma category
- Localization of a category
- Enriched category
- Bicategory

== Topoi, toposes ==
- Sheaf
- Gluing axiom
- Descent (category theory)
- Grothendieck topology
- Introduction to topos theory
- Subobject classifier
- Pointless topology
- Heyting algebra

== History of category theory ==
- History of category theory

== Persons influential in the field of category theory ==
=== Category theory scholars ===
- Saunders Mac Lane
- Samuel Eilenberg
- Max Kelly
- William Lawvere
- André Joyal

== See also ==
- Abstract nonsense
- Glossary of category theory
