= Dual object =

In category theory, a branch of mathematics, a dual object is an analogue of a dual vector space from linear algebra for objects in arbitrary monoidal categories. It is only a partial generalization, based upon the categorical properties of duality for finite-dimensional vector spaces. An object admitting a dual is called a dualizable object. In this formalism, infinite-dimensional vector spaces are not dualizable, since the dual vector space V^{∗} doesn't satisfy the axioms. Often, an object is dualizable only when it satisfies some finiteness or compactness property.

A category in which each object has a dual is called autonomous or rigid. The category of finite-dimensional vector spaces with the standard tensor product is rigid, while the category of all vector spaces is not.

== Motivation ==
Let V be a finite-dimensional vector space over some field K. The standard notion of a dual vector space V^{∗} has the following property: for any K-vector spaces U and W there is an adjunction Hom_{K}(U ⊗ V,W) = Hom_{K}(U, V^{∗} ⊗ W), and this characterizes V^{∗} up to a unique isomorphism. This expression makes sense in any category with an appropriate replacement for the tensor product of vector spaces. For any monoidal category (C, ⊗) one may attempt to define a dual of an object V to be an object V^{∗} ∈ C with a natural isomorphism of bifunctors

Hom_{C}((–)_{1} ⊗ V, (–)_{2}) → Hom_{C}((–)_{1}, V^{∗} ⊗ (–)_{2})

For a well-behaved notion of duality, this map should be not only natural in the sense of category theory, but also respect the monoidal structure in some way. An actual definition of a dual object is thus more complicated.

In a closed monoidal category C, i.e. a monoidal category with an internal Hom functor, an alternative approach is to simulate the standard definition of a dual vector space as a space of functionals. For an object V ∈ C define V^{∗} to be $\underline{\mathrm{Hom}}_C(V, \mathbb{1}_C)$, where 1_{C} is the monoidal identity. In some cases, this object will be a dual object to V in a sense above, but in general it leads to a different theory.

== Definition ==
Consider an object $X$ in a monoidal category $(\mathbf{C},\otimes, I, \alpha, \lambda, \rho)$. The object $X^*$ is called a left dual of $X$ if there exist two morphisms

$\eta:I\to X\otimes X^*$, called the coevaluation, and $\varepsilon:X^*\otimes X\to I$, called the evaluation,

such that the following two diagrams commute:

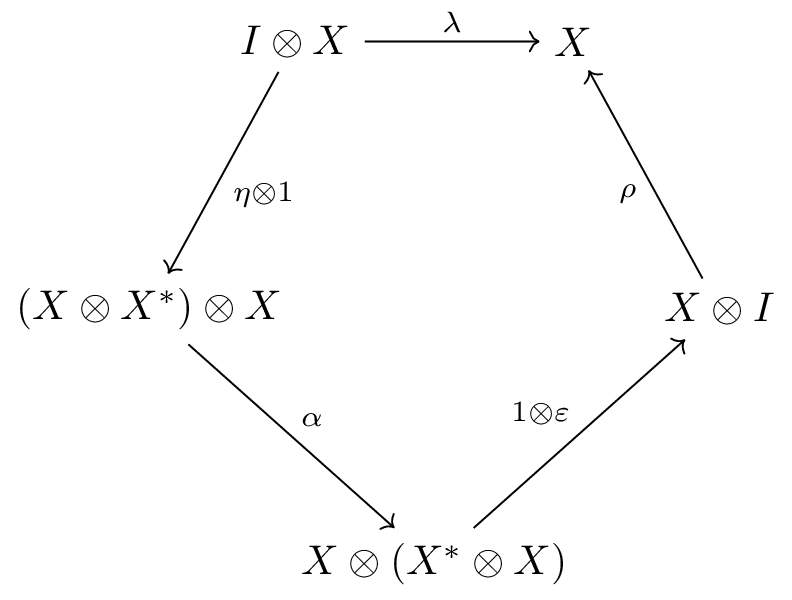
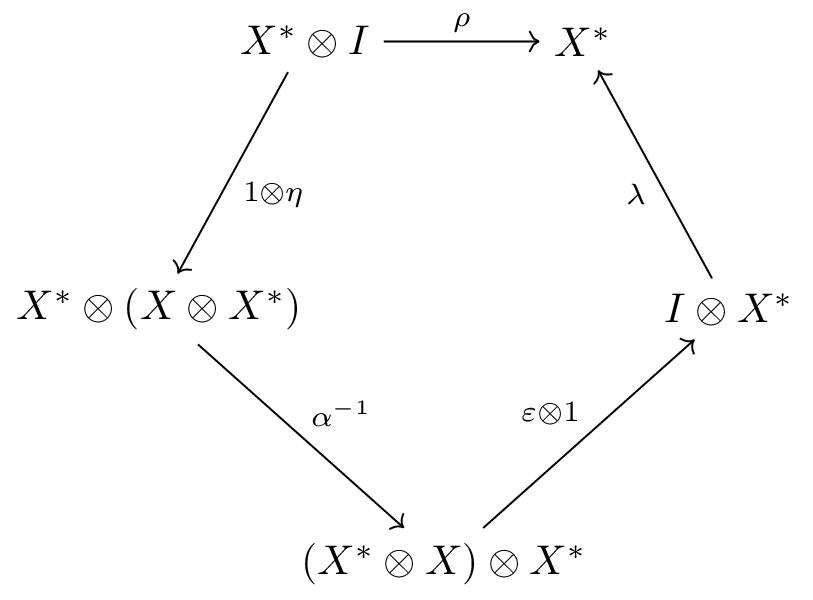
and

The object $X$ is called the right dual of $X^*$. This definition is due to Dold & Puppe (1980).

Left duals are canonically isomorphic when they exist, as are right duals. When C is braided (or symmetric), every left dual is also a right dual, and vice versa.

If we consider a monoidal category as a bicategory with one object, a dual pair is exactly an adjoint pair.

== Examples ==
- Consider a monoidal category (Vect_{K}, ⊗_{K}) of vector spaces over a field K with the standard tensor product. A space V is dualizable if and only if it is finite-dimensional, and in this case the dual object V^{∗} coincides with the standard notion of a dual vector space.
- Consider a monoidal category (Mod_{R}, ⊗_{R}) of modules over a commutative ring R with the standard tensor product. A module M is dualizable if and only if it is a finitely generated projective module. In that case the dual object M^{∗} is also given by the module of homomorphisms Hom_{R}(M, R).
- Consider a homotopy category of pointed spectra Ho(Sp) with the smash product as the monoidal structure. If M is a compact neighborhood retract in $\mathbb{R}^n$ (for example, a compact smooth manifold), then the corresponding pointed spectrum Σ^{∞}(M^{+}) is dualizable. This is a consequence of Spanier–Whitehead duality, which implies in particular Poincaré duality for compact manifolds.
- The category $\mathrm{End}(\mathbf{C})$ of endofunctors of a category $\mathbf{C}$ is a monoidal category under composition of functors. A functor $F$ is a left dual of a functor $G$ if and only if $F$ is left adjoint to $G$.

== Categories with duals ==
A monoidal category where every object has a left (respectively right) dual is sometimes called a left (respectively right) autonomous category. Algebraic geometers call it a left (respectively right) rigid category. A monoidal category where every object has both a left and a right dual is called an autonomous category. An autonomous category that is also symmetric is called a compact closed category.

== Traces ==
Any endomorphism f of a dualizable object admits a trace, which is a certain endomorphism of the monoidal unit of C. This notion includes, as very special cases, the trace in linear algebra and the Euler characteristic of a chain complex.

== See also ==
- Dualizing object
