= Rigid category =

In category theory, a branch of mathematics, a rigid category is a monoidal category where every object is rigid, that is, has a dual X* (the internal Hom [X, 1]) and a morphism 1 → X ⊗ X* satisfying natural conditions. The category is called right rigid or left rigid according to whether it has right duals or left duals. They were first defined (following Alexander Grothendieck) by Neantro Saavedra Rivano in his thesis on Tannakian categories.

== Definition ==
There are at least two equivalent definitions of a rigidity.

An object X of a monoidal category is called left rigid if there is an object Y and morphisms $\eta_X : \mathbf{1} \to X \otimes Y$ and $\epsilon_X : Y \otimes X \to \mathbf{1}$ such that both compositions

$X ~ \xrightarrow{\eta_X \otimes \mathrm{id}_X } ~ (X \otimes Y) \otimes X ~ \xrightarrow{\alpha^{-1}_{X, Y, X} } ~ X \otimes (Y \otimes X) ~ \xrightarrow{\mathrm{id}_X \otimes \epsilon_X } ~ X$

$Y ~ \xrightarrow{\mathrm{id}_Y \otimes \eta_X } ~ Y \otimes (X \otimes Y ) ~ \xrightarrow{~\alpha_{X, Y, X}~} ~ (Y \otimes X) \otimes Y ~ \xrightarrow{\epsilon_X \otimes \mathrm{id}_Y } ~ Y$

are identities. A right rigid object is defined similarly.

The operation of taking duals gives a contravariant functor ( )* on a rigid category.

An inverse is an object X^{−1} such that both X ⊗ X^{−1} and X^{−1} ⊗ X are isomorphic to 1, the identity object of the monoidal category. If an object X has a left (respectively right) inverse X^{−1} with respect to the tensor product then it is left (respectively right) rigid, and X* = X^{−1}.

== Uses ==
One important application of rigidity is in the definition of the trace of an endomorphism of a rigid object. The trace can be defined for any pivotal category, i. e. a rigid category such that ( )**, the functor of taking the dual twice repeated, is (monoidally) isomorphic to the identity functor. Then for any right rigid object X, and any other object Y, we may define the isomorphism

$\phi_{X, Y}: \left\{ \begin{array}{rcl} \operatorname{Hom}(\mathbf{1}, X^{*} \otimes Y) & \longrightarrow & \operatorname{Hom}(X, Y) \\ f & \longmapsto & (\epsilon_X \otimes \operatorname{id}_Y) \circ ({\operatorname{id}_X} \otimes f) \end{array} \right.$

and its reciprocal isomorphism

$\psi_{X, Y}: \left\{ \begin{array}{rcl} \operatorname{Hom}(X, Y) & \longrightarrow & \operatorname{Hom}(\mathbf{1}, X^{*} \otimes Y)\\ g & \longmapsto & ({\operatorname{id}_{X^{*}}} \otimes g) \circ \eta_X \end{array} \right.$.

Then for any endomorphism $f : X \to X$, the (right) trace of f is defined as the composition:

$\operatorname{tr} f : \mathbf{1} \xrightarrow{\psi_{X, X}(f)} X^{*} \otimes X \xrightarrow{\gamma_{X, X}} X \otimes X^{*} \xrightarrow{\epsilon_{X}} \mathbf{1},$

Further, the dimension of a rigid object is defined to be:

$\dim X := \operatorname{tr}\operatorname{id}_X$.

A pivotal category in which left and right traces agree on all endomorphisms is called a spherical category.

Rigidity is also important because of its relation to internal Hom's. If X is a left rigid object, then every internal Hom of the form [X, Z] exists and is isomorphic to Z ⊗ Y. In particular, in a rigid category, all internal Hom's exist.

== Alternative terminology ==
An autonomous category is a monoidal category where dual objects exist. A left (resp. right) autonomous category is a monoidal category where every object has a left (resp. right) dual. An autonomous category is a monoidal category where every object has both a left and a right dual. Rigid category is a synonym for autonomous category. In a symmetric monoidal category, the existence of left duals is equivalent to the existence of right duals, categories of this kind are called (symmetric) compact closed categories. In categorial grammars, categories which are both left and right rigid are often called pregroups, and are employed in Lambek calculus, a non-symmetric extension of linear logic.

The concepts of *-autonomous category and autonomous category are directly related, specifically, every autonomous category is *-autonomous. A *-autonomous category may be described as a linearly distributive category with (left and right) negations; such categories have two monoidal products linked with a sort of distributive law. In the case where the two monoidal products coincide and the distributivities are taken from the associativity isomorphism of the single monoidal structure, one obtains autonomous categories.

== Applications ==
The category of pure motives is formed by rigidifying the category of effective pure motives.

Fusion categories are a particular kind of rigid category.
