= Tensor category =

Tensor category (within the subfield category theory of mathematics) may refer to:

- General monoidal categories; or
- More specifically symmetric monoidal categories (such as is the case with, e.g., the theory of Tannakian categories)
