= Group object =

Certain generalizations of groups

In category theory, a branch of mathematics, group objects are certain generalizations of groups that are built on more complicated structures than sets. A typical example of a group object is a topological group, a group whose underlying set is a topological space such that the group operations are continuous.

== Definition ==
Formally, we start with a category C with finite products (i.e. C has a terminal object 1 and any two objects of C have a product). A group object in C is an object G of C together with morphisms

- m : G × G → G (thought of as the "group multiplication")
- e : 1 → G (thought of as the "inclusion of the identity element")
- inv : G → G (thought of as the "inversion operation")

such that the following properties (modeled on the group axioms – more precisely, on the definition of a group used in universal algebra) are satisfied

- m is associative, i.e. m (m × id_{G}) = m (id_{G} × m) as morphisms G × G × G → G, and where e.g. m × id_{G} : G × G × G → G × G; here we identify G × (G × G) in a canonical manner with (G × G) × G.
- e is a two-sided unit of m, i.e. m (id_{G} × e) = p_{1}, where p_{1} : G × 1 → G is the canonical projection, and m (e × id_{G}) = p_{2}, where p_{2} : 1 × G → G is the canonical projection
- inv is a two-sided inverse for m, i.e. if d : G → G × G is the diagonal map, and e_{G} : G → G is the composition of the unique morphism G → 1 (also called the counit) with e, then m (id_{G} × inv) d = e_{G} and m (inv × id_{G}) d = e_{G}.

Note that this is stated in terms of maps – product and inverse must be maps in the category – and without any reference to underlying "elements" of the group object – categories in general do not have elements of their objects.

Another way to state the above is to say G is a group object in a category C if for every object X in C, there is a group structure on the morphisms Hom(X, G) from X to G such that the association of X to Hom(X, G) is a (contravariant) functor from C to the category of groups.

Yet another way to state the above is to define a group object as a monoid object in the cartesian monoidal category (that is, the monoidal category where the product is × and the unit is the terminal object 1), together with an inverse morphism satisfying the above conditions.

== Examples ==
- Each set G for which a group structure (G, m, u, ^{−1}) can be defined can be considered a group object in the category of sets. The map m is the group operation, the map e (whose domain is a singleton) picks out the identity element u of G, and the map inv assigns to every group element its inverse. e_{G} : G → G is the map that sends every element of G to the identity element.
- A topological group is a group object in the category of topological spaces with continuous functions.
- A Lie group is a group object in the category of smooth manifolds with smooth maps.
- A Lie supergroup is a group object in the category of supermanifolds.
- An algebraic group is a group object in the category of algebraic varieties. In modern algebraic geometry, one considers the more general group schemes, group objects in the category of schemes.
- A localic group is a group object in the category of locales.
- The group objects in the category of groups (or monoids) are the abelian groups. The reason for this is that, if inv is assumed to be a homomorphism, then G must be abelian. More precisely: if A is an abelian group and we denote by m the group multiplication of A, by e the inclusion of the identity element, and by inv the inversion operation on A, then (A, m, e, inv) is a group object in the category of groups (or monoids). Conversely, if (A, m, e, inv) is a group object in one of those categories, then m necessarily coincides with the given operation on A, e is the inclusion of the given identity element on A, inv is the inversion operation and A with the given operation is an abelian group. See also Eckmann–Hilton argument.
- The strict 2-group is the group object in the category of small categories.
- Given a category C with finite coproducts, a cogroup object is an object G of C together with a "comultiplication" m: G → G $\oplus$ G, a "coidentity" e: G → 0, and a "coinversion" inv: G → G that satisfy the dual versions of the axioms for group objects. Here 0 is the initial object of C. Cogroup objects occur naturally in algebraic topology.

== See also ==
- Hopf algebras can be seen as a generalization of group objects to monoidal categories.
- Groupoid object
- internal category
