= Dagger symmetric monoidal category =

Symmetric monoidal category with a special involution

In the mathematical field of category theory, a dagger symmetric monoidal category is a monoidal category $\langle\mathbf{C},\otimes, I\rangle$ that also possesses a dagger structure. That is, this category comes equipped not only with a tensor product in the category theoretic sense but also with a dagger structure, which is used to describe unitary morphisms and self-adjoint morphisms in $\mathbf{C}$: abstract analogues of those found in FdHilb, the category of finite-dimensional Hilbert spaces. This type of category was introduced by Peter Selinger as an intermediate structure between dagger categories and the dagger compact categories that are used in categorical quantum mechanics, an area that now also considers dagger symmetric monoidal categories when dealing with infinite-dimensional quantum mechanical concepts.

== Formal definition ==
A dagger symmetric monoidal category is a symmetric monoidal category $\mathbf{C}$ that also has a dagger structure such that for all $f:A\rightarrow B$, $g:C\rightarrow D$ and all $A,B,C$ and $D$ in $Ob(\mathbf{C})$,

- $(f\otimes g)^\dagger=f^\dagger\otimes g^\dagger:B\otimes D\rightarrow A\otimes C$;
- $\alpha^\dagger_{A,B,C}=\alpha^{-1}_{A,B,C}:A\otimes (B\otimes C)\rightarrow (A\otimes B)\otimes C$;
- $\rho^\dagger_A=\rho^{-1}_A:A \rightarrow A \otimes I$;
- $\lambda^\dagger_A=\lambda^{-1}_A: A \rightarrow I \otimes A$ and
- $\sigma^\dagger_{A,B}=\sigma^{-1}_{A,B}:B \otimes A \rightarrow A \otimes B$.

Here, $\alpha,\lambda,\rho$ and $\sigma$ are the natural isomorphisms that form the symmetric monoidal structure.

== Examples ==
The following categories are examples of dagger symmetric monoidal categories:

- The category Rel of sets and relations where the tensor is given by the product and where the dagger of a relation is given by its relational converse.
- The category FdHilb of finite-dimensional Hilbert spaces is a dagger symmetric monoidal category where the tensor is the usual tensor product of Hilbert spaces and where the dagger of a linear map is given by its Hermitian adjoint.

A dagger symmetric monoidal category that is also compact closed is a dagger compact category; both of the above examples are in fact dagger compact.

== See also ==
- Strongly ribbon category
