= Tensor–hom adjunction =

Concept in mathematics

In mathematics, the tensor-hom adjunction is the statement that the tensor product $- \otimes X$ and hom-functor $\operatorname{Hom}(X,-)$ form an adjoint pair:

$$\operatorname{Hom}(Y \otimes X, Z) \cong \operatorname{Hom}(Y,\operatorname{Hom}(X,Z)).$$

This is made more precise below. The order of terms in the phrase "tensor-hom adjunction" reflects their relationship: tensor is the left adjoint, while hom is the right adjoint.

== General statement for modules ==
Say R and S are (possibly noncommutative) rings, and consider the right module categories (an analogous statement holds for left modules):

$$\mathcal{C} = \mathrm{Mod}_S\quad \text{and} \quad  \mathcal{D} = \mathrm{Mod}_R .$$

Fix an $(R,S)$-bimodule $X$ and define functors $F \colon \mathcal D \rightarrow \mathcal C$ and $G \colon \mathcal C \rightarrow \mathcal D$ as follows:

$$F(Y) = Y \otimes_R X \quad \text{for } Y \in \mathcal{D}$$

$$G(Z) = \operatorname{Hom}_S (X, Z) \quad \text{for } Z \in \mathcal{C}$$

Then $F$ is left adjoint to $G$. This means there is a natural isomorphism

$$\operatorname{Hom}_S (Y \otimes_R X, Z) \cong \operatorname{Hom}_R (Y , \operatorname{Hom}_S (X, Z)).$$

This is actually an isomorphism of abelian groups. More precisely, if $Y$ is an $(A,R)$-bimodule and $Z$ is a $(B,S)$-bimodule, then this is an isomorphism of $(B,A)$-bimodules. This is one of the motivating examples of the structure in a closed bicategory.

== Counit and unit ==
Like all adjunctions, the tensor-hom adjunction can be described by its counit and unit natural transformations. Using the notation from the previous section, the counit

$$\varepsilon : FG \to 1_{\mathcal{C}}$$

has components

$$\varepsilon_Z : \operatorname{Hom}_S (X, Z) \otimes_R X \to Z$$

given by evaluation: For

$$\phi \in \operatorname{Hom}_S (X, Z) \quad \text{and} \quad x \in X,$$

$$\varepsilon(\phi \otimes x) = \phi(x).$$

The components of the unit

$$\eta : 1_{\mathcal{D}} \to GF$$

$$\eta_Y : Y \to \operatorname{Hom}_S (X, Y \otimes_R X)$$

are defined as follows: For $y$ in $Y$,

$$\eta_Y(y) \in \operatorname{Hom}_S (X, Y \otimes_R X)$$

is a right $S$-module homomorphism given by

$$\eta_Y(y)(t) = y \otimes t \quad \text{for } t \in X.$$

The counit and unit equations can now be explicitly verified. For $Y$ in $\mathcal{D}$,

$$\varepsilon_{FY}\circ F(\eta_Y) :
Y \otimes_R X \to
\operatorname{Hom}_S (X , Y \otimes_R X) \otimes_R X \to
Y \otimes_R X$$

is given on simple tensors of $Y \otimes X$ by

$$\varepsilon_{FY}\circ F(\eta_Y)(y \otimes x) = \eta_Y(y)(x) = y \otimes x.$$

Likewise,

$$G(\varepsilon_Z)\circ\eta_{GZ} :
\operatorname{Hom}_S (X, Z) \to
\operatorname{Hom}_S (X, \operatorname{Hom}_S (X , Z) \otimes_R X) \to
\operatorname{Hom}_S (X, Z).$$

For $\phi$ in $\operatorname{Hom}_S (X, Z)$,

$$G(\varepsilon_Z)\circ\eta_{GZ}(\phi)$$

is a right $S$-module homomorphism defined by

$$G(\varepsilon_Z)\circ\eta_{GZ}(\phi)(x) = \varepsilon_{Z}(\phi \otimes x) = \phi(x)$$

and therefore

$$G(\varepsilon_Z)\circ\eta_{GZ}(\phi) = \phi.$$

== The Ext and Tor functors ==
The Hom functor $\hom(X,-)$ commutes with arbitrary limits, while the tensor product $-\otimes X$ functor commutes with arbitrary colimits that exist in their domain category. However, in general, $\hom(X,-)$ fails to commute with colimits, and $-\otimes X$ fails to commute with limits; this failure occurs even among finite limits or colimits. This failure to preserve short exact sequences motivates the definition of the Ext functor and the Tor functor.

== In arithmetic ==
We can illustrate the tensor-hom adjunction in the category of functions of finite sets. Given a set $N$, its Hom functor takes any set $A$ to the set of functions from $N$ to $A$. The isomorphism class of this set of functions is the natural number $A^N$. Similarly, the tensor product $- \otimes N$ takes a set $A$ to its cartesian product with $N$. Its isomorphism class is thus the natural number $AN$.

This allows us to interpret the isomorphism of hom-sets

$$\operatorname{Hom}(Y \otimes X, Z) \cong \operatorname{Hom}(Y,\operatorname{Hom}(X,Z)).$$

that universally characterizes the tensor-hom adjunction, as the categorification of the remarkably basic law of exponents

$$Z^{YX}=(Z^X)^Y.$$

== See also ==
- Closed monoidal category
- Eckmann–Hilton duality
- Change of rings
