= Strictification =

In mathematics, specifically in category theory, a strictification refers to statements of the form “every weak structure of some sort is equivalent to a stricter one.” Such a result was first proven for monoidal categories by Mac Lane, and it is often possible to derive strictifications from coherence results and vice versa.

== Monoidal category ==
- Every monoidal category is monoidally equivalent to a strict monoidal category. This is (essentially) the Mac Lane coherence theorem.

== See also ==
- Coherence condition
