= Monoidal category action =

In algebra, an action of a monoidal category $(S, \otimes, e)$ on a category $X$ is a functor

$$\cdot: S \times X \to X$$

such that there are natural isomorphisms $s \cdot (t \cdot x) \simeq (s \otimes t)\cdot x$ and $e \cdot x \simeq x$, which satisfy the coherence conditions analogous to those in $S$. $S$ is said to act on $X$.

Any monoidal category $S$ is a monoid object in $\mathsf{Cat}$ with the monoidal product being the category product. This means that $X$ equipped with an $S$-action is exactly a module over a monoid in $\mathsf{Cat}$.

For example, $S$ acts on itself via the monoid operation $\otimes$.
