= Dagger category =

Category equipped with involution

In category theory, a branch of mathematics, a dagger category (also called involutive category or category with involution) is a category equipped with a certain structure called dagger or involution. The name dagger category was coined by Peter Selinger.

== Formal definition ==
A dagger category is a category $\mathcal{C}$ equipped with an involutive contravariant endofunctor $\dagger$ which is the identity on objects.

In detail, this means that:

- for all morphisms $f: A \to B$, there exists its adjoint $f^\dagger: B \to A$
- for all morphisms $f$, $(f^\dagger)^\dagger = f$
- for all objects $A$, $\mathrm{id}_A^\dagger = \mathrm{id}_A$
- for all $f: A \to B$ and $g: B \to C$, $(g \circ f)^\dagger = f^\dagger \circ g^\dagger: C \to A$

Note that in the previous definition, the term "adjoint" is used in a way analogous to (and inspired by) the linear-algebraic sense, not in the category-theoretic sense.

Some sources define a category with involution to be a dagger category with the additional property that its set of morphisms is partially ordered and that the order of morphisms is compatible with the composition of morphisms, that is $a < b$ implies $a\circ c<b\circ c$ for morphisms $a$, $b$, $c$ whenever their sources and targets are compatible.

== Examples ==
- The category Rel of sets and relations possesses a dagger structure: for a given relation $R:X \rightarrow Y$ in Rel, the relation $R^\dagger:Y \rightarrow X$ is the relational converse of $R$. In this example, a self-adjoint morphism is a symmetric relation.
- The category Cob of cobordisms is a dagger compact category, in particular it possesses a dagger structure.
- The category Hilb of Hilbert spaces also possesses a dagger structure: Given a bounded linear map $f:A \rightarrow B$, the map $f^\dagger:B \rightarrow A$ is just its adjoint in the usual sense.
- Any monoid with involution is a dagger category with only one object. In fact, every endomorphism hom-set in a dagger category is not simply a monoid, but a monoid with involution, because of the dagger.
- A discrete category is trivially a dagger category.
- A groupoid (and as trivial corollary, a group) also has a dagger structure with the adjoint of a morphism being its inverse. In this case, all morphisms are unitary (definition below).

== Remarkable morphisms ==
In a dagger category $\mathcal{C}$, a morphism $f$ is called

- unitary if $f^\dagger = f^{-1},$
- self-adjoint if $f^\dagger = f.$

The latter is only possible for an endomorphism $f\colon A \to A$. The terms unitary and self-adjoint in the previous definition are taken from the category of Hilbert spaces, where the morphisms satisfying those properties are then unitary and self-adjoint in the usual sense.

== See also ==
- *-algebra
- Dagger symmetric monoidal category
- Dagger compact category
