= Cartesian monoidal category =

Type of category in category theory

In mathematics, specifically in the field known as category theory, a monoidal category where the monoidal ("tensor") product is the categorical product is called a cartesian monoidal category. Any category with finite products (a "finite product category") can be thought of as a cartesian monoidal category. In any cartesian monoidal category, the terminal object is the monoidal unit. Dually, a monoidal finite coproduct category with the monoidal structure given by the coproduct and unit the initial object is called a cocartesian monoidal category, and any finite coproduct category can be thought of as a cocartesian monoidal category.

Cartesian categories with an internal Hom functor that is an adjoint functor to the product are called Cartesian closed categories.

== Properties ==
Cartesian monoidal categories have a number of special and important properties, such as the existence of diagonal maps Δ_{x} : x → x ⊗ x and augmentations e_{x} : x → I for any object x. In applications to computer science we can think of Δ as "duplicating data" and e as "deleting data". These maps make any object into a comonoid. In fact, any object in a cartesian monoidal category becomes a comonoid in a unique way.

== Examples ==
Cartesian monoidal categories:

- Set, the category of sets with the singleton set serving as the unit.
- Cat, the bicategory of small categories with the product category, where the category with one object and only its identity map is the unit.

Cocartesian monoidal categories:

- Vect, the category of vector spaces over a given field, can be made cocartesian monoidal with the monoidal product given by the direct sum of vector spaces and the trivial vector space as unit.
- Ab, the category of abelian groups, with the direct sum of abelian groups as monoidal product and the trivial group as unit.
- More generally, the category R-Mod of (left) modules over a ring R (commutative or not) becomes a cocartesian monoidal category with the direct sum of modules as tensor product and the trivial module as unit.

In each of these categories of modules equipped with a cocartesian monoidal structure, finite products and coproducts coincide (in the sense that the product and coproduct of finitely many objects are isomorphic). Or more formally, if f : X_{1} ∐ ... ∐ X_{n} → X_{1} × ... × X_{n} is the "canonical" map from the n-ary coproduct of objects X_{j} to their product, for a natural number n, in the event that the map f is an isomorphism, we say that a biproduct for the objects X_{j} is an object $X = \bigoplus_{j \in {1,\ldots,n}} X_j$ isomorphic to $\coprod_{j\in {1,\ldots,n}}X_j$ and $\prod_{j\in {1,\ldots,n}}X_j$ together with maps i_{j} : X_{j} → X and p_{j} : X → X_{j} such that the pair (X, {i_{j}}) is a coproduct diagram for the objects X_{j} and the pair (X, {p_{j}}) is a product diagram for the objects X_{j} , and where p_{j} ∘ i_{j} = id_{X_{j}}. If, in addition, the category in question has a zero object, so that for any objects A and B there is a unique map 0_{A,B} : A → 0 → B, it often follows that p_{k} ∘ i_{j} = : δ_{ij}, the Kronecker delta, where we interpret 0 and 1 as the 0 maps and identity maps of the objects X_{j} and X_{k}, respectively. See pre-additive category for more.

== See also ==
- Cartesian closed category
