= Category of finite-dimensional Hilbert spaces =

Category whose objects are finite-dimensional Hilbert spaces

In mathematics, the category FdHilb has all finite-dimensional Hilbert spaces for objects and the linear transformations between them as morphisms. Whereas the theory described by the normal category of Hilbert spaces, Hilb, is ordinary quantum mechanics, the corresponding theory on finite dimensional Hilbert spaces is called fdQM.

== Properties ==
This category

- is monoidal,
- possesses finite biproducts, and
- is dagger compact.

According to a theorem of Selinger, the category of finite-dimensional Hilbert spaces is complete in the dagger compact category. Many ideas from Hilbert spaces, such as the no-cloning theorem, hold in general for dagger compact categories. See that article for additional details.
