= Hermitian adjoint =

Conjugate transpose of an operator in infinite dimensions

In mathematics, specifically in operator theory, each linear operator $A$ on an inner product space defines a Hermitian adjoint (or adjoint) operator $A^*$ on that space according to the rule

$$\langle Ax,y \rangle = \langle x,A^*y \rangle,$$

where $\langle \cdot,\cdot \rangle$ is the inner product on the vector space.

The adjoint may also be called the Hermitian conjugate or simply the Hermitian after Charles Hermite. It is often denoted by A^{†} in fields like physics, especially when used in conjunction with bra–ket notation in quantum mechanics. In finite dimensions where operators can be represented by matrices, the Hermitian adjoint is given by the conjugate transpose (also known as the Hermitian transpose).

The above definition of an adjoint operator extends verbatim to bounded linear operators on Hilbert spaces $H$. The definition has been further extended to include unbounded densely defined operators, whose domain is topologically dense in, but not necessarily equal to, $H.$

== Informal definition ==
Consider a linear map $A: H_1\to H_2$ between Hilbert spaces. Without taking care of any details, the adjoint operator is the (in most cases uniquely defined) linear operator $A^* : H_2 \to H_1$ fulfilling

$$\left\langle A h_1, h_2 \right\rangle_{H_2} = \left\langle h_1, A^* h_2 \right\rangle_{H_1},$$

where $\langle\cdot, \cdot \rangle_{H_i}$ is the inner product in the Hilbert space $H_i$, which is linear in the first coordinate and conjugate linear in the second coordinate. Note the special case where both Hilbert spaces are identical and $A$ is an operator on that Hilbert space.

When one trades the inner product for the dual pairing, one can define the adjoint, also called the transpose, of an operator $A: E \to F$, where $E, F$ are Banach spaces with corresponding norms $\|\cdot\|_E, \|\cdot\|_F$. Here (again not considering any technicalities), its adjoint operator is defined as $A^*: F^* \to E^*$ with

$$A^*f = f \circ A : u \mapsto f(Au),$$

i.e., $\left(A^*f\right)(u) = f(Au)$ for $f \in F^*, u \in E$.

The above definition in the Hilbert space setting is really just an application of the Banach space case when one identifies a Hilbert space with its dual (via the Riesz representation theorem). Then it is only natural that we can also obtain the adjoint of an operator $A: H \to E$, where $H$ is a Hilbert space and $E$ is a Banach space. The dual is then defined as $A^*: E^* \to H$ with $A^*f = h_f$ such that

$$\langle h_f, h\rangle_H = f(Ah).$$

== Definition for unbounded operators between Banach spaces ==
Let $\left(E, \|\cdot\|_E\right), \left(F, \|\cdot\|_F\right)$ be Banach spaces. Suppose $A: D(A) \to F$ and $D(A) \subset E$, and suppose that $A$ is a (possibly unbounded) linear operator which is densely defined (i.e., $D(A)$ is dense in $E$). Then its adjoint operator $A^*$ is defined as follows. The domain is

$$D\left(A^*\right) := \left\{g \in F^*:~ \exists c \geq 0:~ \mbox{ for all } u \in D(A):~ |g(Au)| \leq c \cdot \|u\|_E\right\}.$$

Now for arbitrary but fixed $g \in D(A^*)$ we set $f: D(A) \to \R$ with $f(u) = g(Au)$. By choice of $g$ and definition of $D(A^*)$, f is (uniformly) continuous on $D(A)$ as $|f(u)| = |g(Au)| \leq c\cdot \|u\|_E$. Then by the Hahn–Banach theorem, or alternatively through extension by continuity, this yields an extension of $f$, called $\hat{f}$, defined on all of $E$. This technicality is necessary to later obtain $A^*$ as an operator $D\left(A^*\right) \to E^*$ instead of $D\left(A^*\right) \to (D(A))^*.$ Remark also that this does not mean that $A$ can be extended on all of $E$ but the extension only worked for specific elements $g \in D\left(A^*\right)$.

Now, we can define the adjoint of $A$ as

$$\begin{align}
A^*: F^* \supset D(A^*) &\to E^* \\
g &\mapsto A^*g = \hat f.
\end{align}$$

The fundamental defining identity is thus

$g(Au) = \left(A^* g\right)(u)$ for $u \in D(A).$

== Definition for bounded operators between Hilbert spaces ==
Suppose H is a complex Hilbert space, with inner product $\langle\cdot,\cdot\rangle$. Consider a continuous linear operator A : H → H (for linear operators, continuity is equivalent to being a bounded operator). Then the adjoint of A is the continuous linear operator A^{∗} : H → H satisfying

$$\langle Ax , y \rangle = \left\langle x , A^* y\right\rangle \quad \mbox{for all } x, y \in H.$$

Existence and uniqueness of this operator follows from the Riesz representation theorem.

This can be seen as a generalization of the adjoint matrix of a square matrix which has a similar property involving the standard complex inner product.

== Properties ==
The following properties of the Hermitian adjoint of bounded operators are immediate:

1. Involutivity: A^{∗∗} = A
2. If A is invertible, then so is A^{∗}, with $\left(A^*\right)^{-1} = \left(A^{-1}\right)^*$
3. Conjugate linearity:
  - (A + B)^{∗} = A^{∗} + B^{∗}
  - (λA)^{∗} = λ̅A^{∗}, where λ̅ denotes the complex conjugate of the complex number λ
4. "Anti-distributivity": (AB)^{∗} = B^{∗}A^{∗}

If we define the operator norm of A by

$$\| A \|_\text{op} := \sup \left\{\|Ax\| : \|x\| \le 1\right\}$$

then

$\left\|A^* \right\|_\text{op} = \|A\|_\text{op}.$

Moreover,

$\left\|A^* A \right\|_\text{op} = \|A\|_\text{op}^2.$

One says that a norm that satisfies this condition behaves like a "largest value", extrapolating from the case of self-adjoint operators.

The set of bounded linear operators on a complex Hilbert space H together with the adjoint operation and the operator norm form the prototype of a C*-algebra.

== Adjoint of densely defined unbounded operators between Hilbert spaces ==
=== Definition ===
Let the inner product $\langle \cdot, \cdot \rangle$ be linear in the first argument. A densely defined operator A from a complex Hilbert space H to itself is a linear operator whose domain D(A) is a dense linear subspace of H and whose values lie in H. By definition, the domain D(A^{∗}) of its adjoint A^{∗} is the set of all y ∈ H for which there is a z ∈ H satisfying

$$\langle Ax , y \rangle = \langle x , z \rangle \quad \mbox{for all } x \in D(A).$$

Owing to the density of $D(A)$ and Riesz representation theorem, $z$ is uniquely defined, and, by definition, $A^*y=z.$

Properties 1.–5. hold with appropriate clauses about domains and codomains. For instance, the last property now states that (AB)^{∗} is an extension of B^{∗}A^{∗} if A, B and AB are densely defined operators.

=== ker A^{*} = (im A)^{⊥} ===
For every $y \in \ker A^*,$ the linear functional $x \mapsto \langle Ax,y \rangle = \langle x,A^*y\rangle$ is identically zero, and hence $y \in (\operatorname{im} A)^\perp.$

Conversely, the assumption that $y \in (\operatorname{im} A)^\perp$ causes the functional $x \mapsto \langle Ax,y \rangle$ to be identically zero. Since the functional is obviously bounded, the definition of $A^*$ assures that $y \in D(A^*).$ The fact that, for every $x \in D(A),$ $\langle Ax,y \rangle = \langle x,A^*y\rangle = 0$ shows that $A^* y \in D(A)^\perp =\overline{D(A)}^\perp = \{0\},$ given that $D(A)$ is dense.

This property shows that $\operatorname{ker}A^*$ is a topologically closed subspace even when $D(A^*)$ is not.

=== Geometric interpretation ===
If $H_1$ and $H_2$ are Hilbert spaces, then $H_1 \oplus H_2$ is a Hilbert space with the inner product

$$\bigl \langle (a,b),(c,d) \bigr \rangle_{H_1 \oplus H_2} \stackrel{\text{def}}{=} \langle a,c \rangle_{H_1} + \langle b,d \rangle_{H_2},$$

where $a,c \in H_1$ and $b,d \in H_2.$

Let $J\colon H\oplus H \to H \oplus H$ be the symplectic mapping, i.e. $J(\xi, \eta) = (-\eta, \xi).$ Then the graph

$$G(A^*) =\{(x,y) \mid x\in D(A^*),\ y=A^*x\} \subseteq H \oplus H$$

of $A^*$ is the orthogonal complement of $JG(A):$

$$G(A^*) = (JG(A))^\perp = \{ (x, y) \in H \oplus H : \bigl \langle (x, y) , (-A\xi, \xi) \bigr \rangle_{H \oplus H} = 0\;\;\forall \xi \in D(A)\}.$$

The assertion follows from the equivalences

$$\bigl \langle (x, y) , (-A\xi, \xi) \bigr \rangle = 0 \quad \Leftrightarrow \quad  \langle A\xi, x \rangle = \langle \xi, y \rangle,$$

and

$$\Bigl[ \forall \xi \in D(A)\ \ \langle A\xi, x \rangle = \langle \xi, y \rangle \Bigr]  \quad \Leftrightarrow \quad x \in D(A^*)\ \&\ y = A^*x.$$

==== Corollaries ====
===== A^{*} is closed =====
An operator $A$ is closed if the graph $G(A)$ is topologically closed in $H \oplus H.$ The graph $G(A^*)$ of the adjoint operator $A^*$ is the orthogonal complement of a subspace, and therefore is closed.

===== A^{*} is densely defined ⇔ A is closable =====
An operator $A$ is closable if the topological closure $G^\text{cl}(A) \subseteq H \oplus H$ of the graph $G(A)$ is the graph of a function. Since $G^\text{cl}(A)$ is a (closed) linear subspace, the word "function" may be replaced with "linear operator". For the same reason, $A$ is closable if and only if $(0,v) \notin G^\text{cl}(A)$ unless $v=0.$

The adjoint $A^*$ is densely defined if and only if $A$ is closable. This follows from the fact that, for every $v \in H,$

$$v \in D(A^*)^\perp\ \Leftrightarrow\ (0,v) \in G^\text{cl}(A),$$

which, in turn, is proven through the following chain of equivalencies:

$$\begin{align}
v \in D(A^*)^\perp &\Longleftrightarrow (v,0) \in G(A^*)^\perp
\Longleftrightarrow (v,0) \in (JG(A))^\text{cl} = JG^\text{cl}(A) \\
&\Longleftrightarrow (0,-v) = J^{-1}(v,0) \in G^\text{cl}(A) \\
&\Longleftrightarrow (0,v) \in G^\text{cl}(A).
\end{align}$$

===== A^{**} = A^{cl} =====
The closure $A^\text{cl}$ of an operator $A$ is the operator whose graph is $G^\text{cl}(A)$ if this graph represents a function. As above, the word "function" may be replaced with "operator". Furthermore, $A^{**} = A^{\text{cl}},$ meaning that $G(A^{**}) = G^{\text{cl}}(A).$

To prove this, observe that $J^* = -J,$ i.e. $\langle Jx,y\rangle_{H \oplus H} = -\langle x,Jy\rangle_{H \oplus H},$ for every $x,y \in H \oplus H.$ Indeed,

$$\begin{align}
\langle J(x_1,x_2),(y_1,y_2)\rangle_{H \oplus H}
&= \langle (-x_2,x_1),(y_1,y_2)\rangle_{H \oplus H}
= \langle -x_2,y_1\rangle_H + \langle x_1,y_2 \rangle_H \\
&= \langle x_1,y_2 \rangle_H + \langle x_2,-y_1 \rangle_H
= \langle (x_1,x_2),-J(y_1,y_2)\rangle_{H \oplus H}.
\end{align}$$

In particular, for every $y \in H \oplus H$ and every subspace $V \subseteq H \oplus H,$ $y \in (JV)^\perp$ if and only if $Jy \in V^\perp.$ Thus, $J[(JV)^\perp] = V^\perp$ and $[J[(JV)^\perp]]^\perp = V^\text{cl}.$ Substituting $V = G(A),$ obtain $G^\text{cl}(A) = G(A^{**}).$

===== A^{*} = (A^{cl})^{*} =====
For a closable operator $A,$ $A^* = \left(A^\text{cl}\right)^*,$ meaning that $G(A^*) = G\left(\left(A^\text{cl}\right)^*\right).$ Indeed,

$$G\left(\left(A^\text{cl}\right)^*\right) = \left(JG^\text{cl}(A)\right)^\perp = \left(\left(JG(A)\right)^\text{cl}\right)^\perp = (JG(A))^\perp = G(A^*).$$

=== Counterexample where the adjoint is not densely defined ===
Let $H=L^2(\mathbb{R},l),$ where $l$ is the linear measure. Select a measurable, bounded, non-identically zero function $f \notin L^2,$ and pick $\varphi_0 \in L^2 \setminus \{0\}.$ Define

$$A \varphi = \langle f,\varphi\rangle \varphi_0.$$

It follows that $D(A) = \{\varphi \in L^2 \mid \langle f,\varphi\rangle \neq \infty\}.$ The subspace $D(A)$ contains all the $L^2$ functions with compact support. Since $\mathbf{1}_{[-n,n]} \cdot \varphi\ \stackrel{L^2}{\to}\ \varphi,$ $A$ is densely defined. For every $\varphi \in D(A)$ and $\psi \in D(A^*),$

$$\langle \varphi, A^*\psi \rangle = \langle A\varphi, \psi \rangle = \langle \langle f,\varphi \rangle\varphi_0, \psi \rangle = \langle f,\varphi \rangle\cdot \langle \varphi_0, \psi \rangle = \langle \varphi, \langle \varphi_0, \psi \rangle f\rangle.$$

Thus, $A^* \psi = \langle \varphi_0, \psi \rangle f.$ The definition of adjoint operator requires that $\mathop{\text{Im}}A^* \subseteq H=L^2.$ Since $f \notin L^2,$ this is only possible if $\langle \varphi_0, \psi \rangle= 0.$ For this reason, $D(A^*) = \{\varphi_0\}^\perp.$ Hence, $A^*$ is not densely defined and is identically zero on $D(A^*).$ As a result, $A$ is not closable and has no second adjoint $A^{**}.$

== Hermitian operators ==
A bounded operator A : H → H is called Hermitian or self-adjoint if

$$A = A^*$$

which is equivalent to

$\langle Ax , y \rangle = \langle x , A y \rangle \mbox{ for all } x, y \in H.$

In some sense, these operators play the role of the real numbers (being equal to their own "complex conjugate") and form a real vector space. They serve as the model of real-valued observables in quantum mechanics. See the article on self-adjoint operators for a full treatment.

== Adjoints of conjugate-linear operators ==
For a conjugate-linear operator the definition of adjoint needs to be adjusted in order to compensate for the complex conjugation. An adjoint operator of the conjugate-linear operator A on a complex Hilbert space H is an conjugate-linear operator A^{∗} : H → H with the property:

$$\langle Ax , y \rangle = \overline{\left\langle x , A^* y \right\rangle} \quad \text{for all } x, y \in H.$$

== Other adjoints ==
The equation

$$\langle Ax , y \rangle = \left\langle x, A^* y \right\rangle$$

is formally similar to the defining properties of pairs of adjoint functors in category theory, and this is where adjoint functors got their name.

The notion of adjoint operators on Hilbert spaces is also abstracted in the definition of a dagger category or dagger symmetric monoidal category.

== See also ==
- Mathematical concepts
  - Conjugate transpose
  - Hermitian operator
  - Pullback § Functional analysis
  - Transpose of linear maps
- Physical applications
  - Operator (physics)
  - †-algebra
