= Dominant functor =

In category theory, an abstract branch of mathematics, a dominant functor is a functor F : C → D in which every object of D is a retract of an object of the form F(c) for some object c of C. In other words, $F$ is dominant if for every object $d \in D$, there is an object $c \in C$ together with morphisms $r\colon F(c) \to d$ and $s\colon d \to F(c)$ such that $r\circ s=\operatorname{id}_{d}$.

== See also ==
- Essentially surjective functor
