= Closed category =

Category whose hom objects correspond (di-)naturally to objects in itself

In category theory, a branch of mathematics, a closed category is a special kind of category.

In a locally small category, the external hom (x, y) maps a pair of objects to a set of morphisms. So in the category of sets, this is an object of the category itself. In the same vein, in a closed category, the (object of) morphisms from one object to another can be seen as lying inside the category. This is the internal hom [x, y].

Every closed category has a forgetful functor to the category of sets, which in particular takes the internal hom to the external hom.

== Definition ==
A closed category can be defined as a category $\mathcal{C}$ with a so-called internal Hom functor

$$\left[-\ -\right] : \mathcal{C}^{op} \times \mathcal{C} \to \mathcal{C}$$

with left Yoneda arrows

$$L : \left[B\ C\right] \to \left[\left[A\ B\right] \left[A\ C\right]\right]$$

natural in $B$ and $C$ and dinatural in $A$, and a fixed object $I$ of $\mathcal{C}$ with a natural isomorphism

$$i_A : A \cong \left[I\ A\right]$$

and a dinatural transformation

$$j_A : I \to \left[A\ A\right]$$,

all satisfying certain coherence conditions.

== Examples ==
- Cartesian closed categories are closed categories. In particular, any elementary topos is closed. The canonical example is the category of sets.
- Compact closed categories are closed categories. The canonical example is the category FdVect with finite-dimensional vector spaces as objects and linear maps as morphisms.
- More generally, any monoidal closed category is a closed category. In this case, the object $I$ is the monoidal unit.
