= Symmetric monoidal category =

Concept in mathematical category theory

In category theory, a branch of mathematics, a symmetric monoidal category is a monoidal category (i.e. a category in which a "tensor product" $\otimes$ is defined) such that the tensor product is symmetric (i.e. $A\otimes B$ is, in a certain strict sense, naturally isomorphic to $B\otimes A$ for all objects $A$ and $B$ of the category). One of the prototypical examples of a symmetric monoidal category is the category of vector spaces over some fixed field k, using the ordinary tensor product of vector spaces.

== Definition ==
A symmetric monoidal category is a monoidal category (C, ⊗, I) such that, for every pair A, B of objects in C, there is an isomorphism $s_{AB}: A \otimes B \to B \otimes A$ called the swap map that is natural in both A and B and such that the following diagrams commute:

- The unit coherence:
- The associativity coherence:
- The inverse law:

In the diagrams above, a, l, and r are the associativity isomorphism, the left unit isomorphism, and the right unit isomorphism respectively.

== Examples ==
Some examples and non-examples of symmetric monoidal categories:

- The category of sets. The tensor product is the set theoretic cartesian product, and any singleton can be fixed as the unit object.
- The category of groups. The tensor product is the direct product of groups, and the trivial group is the unit object.
- More generally, any category with finite products, that is, a cartesian monoidal category, is symmetric monoidal. The tensor product is the direct product of objects, and any terminal object (empty product) is the unit object.
- The category of bimodules over a ring R is monoidal (using the ordinary tensor product of modules), but not necessarily symmetric. If R is commutative, the category of left R-modules is symmetric monoidal. The latter example class includes the category of all vector spaces over a given field.
- Given a field k and a group (or a Lie algebra over k), the category of all k-linear representations of the group (or of the Lie algebra) is a symmetric monoidal category. Here the standard tensor product of representations is used.
- The categories (Ste,$\circledast$) and (Ste,$\odot$) of stereotype spaces over ${\mathbb C}$ are symmetric monoidal, and moreover, (Ste,$\circledast$) is a closed symmetric monoidal category with the internal hom-functor $\oslash$.

== Properties ==
The classifying space (geometric realization of the nerve) of a symmetric monoidal category is an $E_\infty$ space, so its group completion is an infinite loop space.

== Specializations ==
A dagger symmetric monoidal category is a symmetric monoidal category with a compatible dagger structure.

A cosmos is a complete cocomplete closed symmetric monoidal category.

== Generalizations ==
In a symmetric monoidal category, the natural isomorphisms $s_{AB}: A \otimes B \to B \otimes A$ are their own inverses in the sense that $s_{BA}\circ s_{AB}=1_{A\otimes B}$. If we abandon this requirement (but still require that $A\otimes B$ be naturally isomorphic to $B\otimes A$), we obtain the more general notion of a braided monoidal category.

== See also ==
- Pseudo-tensor category
