= Product category =

Product of two categories, in category theory

In the mathematical field of category theory, the product of two categories C and D, denoted C × D and called a product category, is an extension of the concept of the Cartesian product of two sets. Product categories are used to define bifunctors and multifunctors.

== Definition ==
The product category C × D has:

- as objects:
  pairs of objects (A, B), where A is an object of C and B of D;
- as arrows from (A_{1}, B_{1}) to (A_{2}, B_{2}):
  pairs of arrows (f, g), where f : A_{1} → A_{2} is an arrow of C and g : B_{1} → B_{2} is an arrow of D;
- as composition, component-wise composition from the contributing categories:
  (f_{2}, g_{2}) o (f_{1}, g_{1}) = (f_{2} o f_{1}, g_{2} o g_{1});
- as identities, pairs of identities from the contributing categories:
  1_{(A, B)} = (1_{A}, 1_{B}).

A product of a family of categories is defined exactly the same way.

== Universal property ==
Just like for sets, a product of a family of categories is characterized by the following universal property. Given categories $C_i$ indexed by a set $I$, $P = \prod C_i, p_j : P \to C_j, j \in I$ satisfy:

given a family of functors $f_i : D \to C_i$, there exists a unique functor $f : D \to P$ such that $f_j = p_j \circ f$ for each $j \in I$.

Put in another way, a product of a family of small categories is exactly the categorical product of them in the category of small categories $\mathsf{Cat}$. Thus, for example,
$$\textstyle \mathsf{Fct}(A, \prod_i B_i) \simeq \prod_i \mathsf{Fct}(A, B_i)$$

where $\mathsf{Fct}$ denotes a functor category.

== Functoriality ==
Given two functors $f : C \to D, g : C' \to D'$, the product $f \times g : C \times C' \to D \times D'$ is defined component-wise; that is,
$$(f \times g)(x, x') = (f(x), g(x'))$$
for a pair of objects or morphisms $x, x'$. (This product may also be characterized by the universal property similar to that for categories.) This way, we get the functor

$$\times : \mathsf{Cat} \times \mathsf{Cat} \to \mathsf{Cat}.$$

It satisfies the tensor-hom adjunction in the sense

$$\operatorname{Hom}_{\mathsf{Cat}}(A \times B, C) \simeq \operatorname{Hom}_{\mathsf{Cat}}(A, \mathsf{Fct}(B, C))$$

where $\mathsf{Fct}$ denotes a functor category.

== Example: C × 2 ==
Let $f, g : C \to D$ be functors. Suppose there is a natural transformation $\varphi : f \to g$. Then $\varphi$ determines the functor

$$h : C \times \underline{2} \to D$$

such that

$$h(\cdot, 0) = f, \, h(\cdot, 1) = g$$,

where $\underline{2} = \{ 0, 1 \}$ is the category with two objects and the non-identity morphism $\rightsquigarrow: 0 \to 1$. Intuitively, h is a non-invertible homotopy from $f$ to $g$. Indeed, define $h$ by, for $x : a \to b$ in $C$,

$$h(x, \operatorname{id}_0) = f(x), \, h(x, \operatorname{id}_1) = g(x), \, h(x, \rightsquigarrow) = g(x) \circ \varphi_a = \varphi_b \circ f(x).$$

Conversely, given $h : C \times \underline{2} \to D$, we get $f, g, \varphi$ by $f = h(\cdot, 0), \, g = h(\cdot, 1)$ and $\varphi_a = h(\operatorname{id}_a, \rightsquigarrow)$.

== Bifunctor ==
A functor whose domain is a product category is called a bifunctor. A bifunctor can be defined in each variable separately in the following sense:

Proposition— Each bifunctor

$$F : A \times B \to C$$

determines the families of the functors, for objects $a$ in $A$ and $b$ in $B$,

$$F_b : A \to C, \, F_a : B \to C$$

given by

$F_b a = F(a, b)$ and $F_b f = F(f, \operatorname{id}_b)$

for $f : a \to a'$ and similarly for $F_a$. They commute in the sense:

$$F_{a'} g \circ F_b f = F_{b'} f \circ F_a g$$.

Conversely, given families of functors $F_b, F_a$ as above, if they commute, they define the bifunctor $F : A \times B \to C$ by

$$F(f, g) = F_{b'} f \circ F_a g$$.

For example, consider $(a, b) \mapsto \operatorname{Hom}(a, b) : C^{op} \times C \to \mathsf{Set}$. For each fixed $b$ in $B$, we have the functor

$$\operatorname{Hom}(-, b) : C^{op} \to \mathsf{Set}$$

by pullback; i.e., $f : a \to a'$ goes to the function

$$f^* : \operatorname{Hom}(a', b) \to \operatorname{Hom}(a, b)$$

defined by $f^* g = g \circ f$. On the other hand, $\operatorname{Hom}(a, -) : C \to \mathsf{Set}$ is defined by pushforward; i.e., $f \mapsto f_* = f \circ -$. Clearly, these two functors commute (the associativity of composition) and so, by the proposition, we get the functor called the Hom functor

$$\operatorname{Hom}(-, -) : C^{op} \times C \to \mathsf{Set},$$

which is explicitly given as: $(f, g) \mapsto (h \mapsto g \circ h \circ f).$

There is a similar result for natural transformations between bifunctors:

Proposition— Let $F, G : A, B \to C$ be bifunctors and

$$\alpha = \{ \alpha_{a, b} : F(a, b) \to G(a, b) \mid a \in \operatorname{Ob}(A), b \in \operatorname{Ob}(B) \}$$

a family of morphisms. Then $\alpha : F \to G$ is a natural transformation if and only if it is natural in the first variable and the second variable separately; i.e., for each object $b$ in $B$,

$$\alpha_{-, b} : F(-, b) \to G(-, b)$$

is a natural transformation and similarly in the second variable.
