= Monoidal category =

Category admitting tensor products

In mathematics, a monoidal category (or tensor category) is a category $\mathbf C$ equipped with a bifunctor

$$\otimes : \mathbf{C} \times \mathbf{C} \to \mathbf{C}$$

that is associative up to a natural isomorphism, and an object $I$ that is both a left and right identity for $\otimes$, again up to a natural isomorphism. The associated natural isomorphisms are subject to certain coherence conditions, which ensure that all the relevant diagrams commute.

The ordinary tensor product makes vector spaces, abelian groups, R-modules, or R-algebras into monoidal categories. Monoidal categories can be seen as a generalization of these and other examples. Every (small) monoidal category may also be viewed as a "categorification" of an underlying monoid, namely the monoid whose elements are the isomorphism classes of the category's objects and whose binary operation is given by the category's tensor product.

A rather different application, for which monoidal categories can be considered an abstraction, is a system of data types closed under a type constructor that takes two types and builds an aggregate type. The types serve as the objects, and ⊗ is the aggregate constructor. The associativity up to isomorphism is then a way of expressing that different ways of aggregating the same data—such as $((a,b),c)$ and $(a,(b,c))$—store the same information even though the aggregate values need not be the same. The aggregate type may be analogous to the operation of addition (type sum) or of multiplication (type product). For type product, the identity object is the unit $()$, so there is only one inhabitant of the type, and that is why a product with it is always isomorphic to the other operand. For type sum, the identity object is the void type, which stores no information, and it is impossible to address an inhabitant. The concept of monoidal category does not presume that values of such aggregate types can be taken apart; on the contrary, it provides a framework that unifies classical and quantum information theory.

In category theory, monoidal categories can be used to define the concept of a monoid object and an associated action on the objects of the category. They are also used in the definition of an enriched category.

Monoidal categories have numerous applications outside category theory proper. They are used to define models for the multiplicative fragment of intuitionistic linear logic. They also form the mathematical foundation for the topological order in condensed matter physics. Braided monoidal categories have applications in quantum information, quantum field theory, and string theory.

== Formal definition ==
A monoidal category is a category $\mathbf C$ equipped with a monoidal structure. A monoidal structure consists of the following:

- a bifunctor $\otimes \colon \mathbf C\times\mathbf C\to\mathbf C$ called the monoidal product, or tensor product,
- an object $I$ called the monoidal unit, unit object, or identity object,
- three natural isomorphisms subject to certain coherence conditions expressing the fact that the tensor operation:
  - is associative: there is a natural (in each of three arguments $A$, $B$, $C$) isomorphism $\alpha$, called the associator, with components $\alpha_{A,B,C} \colon A\otimes (B\otimes C) \cong (A\otimes B)\otimes C$,
  - has $I$ as left and right identity: there are two natural isomorphisms $\lambda$ and $\rho$, respectively called the left unitor and right unitor, with components $\lambda_A \colon I\otimes A\cong A$ and $\rho_A \colon A\otimes I\cong A$.

Note that a good way to remember how $\lambda$ and $\rho$ act is by alliteration; Lambda, $\lambda$, cancels the identity on the left, while Rho, $\rho$, cancels the identity on the right.

The coherence conditions for these natural transformations are:

- for all $A$, $B$, $C$ and $D$ in $\mathbf C$, the pentagon diagram

This is one of the main diagrams used to define a monoidal category; it is perhaps the most important one.

commutes;

- for all $A$ and $B$ in $\mathbf C$, the triangle diagram

This is one of the diagrams used in the definition of a monoidal cateogory. It takes care of the case for when there is an instance of an identity between two objects.

commutes.

A strict monoidal category is one for which the natural isomorphisms α, λ and ρ are identities. Every monoidal category is monoidally equivalent to a strict monoidal category (see Mac Lane's coherence theorem).

== Examples ==
- Any category with finite products can be regarded as monoidal with the product as the monoidal product and the terminal object as the unit. Such a category is sometimes called a cartesian monoidal category. For example:
  - Set, the category of sets with the Cartesian product, any particular one-element set serving as the unit.
  - Cat, the category of small categories with the product category, where the category with one object and only its identity map is the unit.
- Dually, any category with finite coproducts is monoidal with the coproduct as the monoidal product and the initial object as the unit. Such a monoidal category is called cocartesian monoidal
- R-Mod, the category of modules over a commutative ring R, is a monoidal category with the tensor product of modules ⊗_{R} serving as the monoidal product and the ring R (thought of as a module over itself) serving as the unit. As special cases one has:
  - K-Vect, the category of vector spaces over a field K, with the one-dimensional vector space K serving as the unit. K-FdVect (the category of finite-dimensional vector spaces) by extension fits under this.
  - Ab, the category of abelian groups, with the group of integers Z serving as the unit.
- For any commutative ring R, the category of R-algebras is monoidal with the tensor product of algebras as the product and R as the unit.
- The category of pointed spaces (restricted to compactly generated spaces for example) is monoidal with the smash product serving as the product and the pointed 0-sphere (a two-point discrete space) serving as the unit.
- The category of all endofunctors on a category C is a strict monoidal category with the composition of functors as the product and the identity functor as the unit.
- Just like for any category E, the full subcategory spanned by any given object is a monoid, it is the case that for any 2-category E, and any object C in Ob(E), the full 2-subcategory of E spanned by {C} is a monoidal category. In the case E = Cat, we get the endofunctors example above.
- Bounded-above meet semilattices are strict symmetric monoidal categories: the product is meet and the identity is the top element.
- Any ordinary monoid $(M,\cdot,1)$ is a small monoidal category with object set $M$, only identities for morphisms, $\cdot$ as tensor product and $1$ as its identity object. Conversely, the set of isomorphism classes (if such a thing makes sense) of a monoidal category is a monoid w.r.t. the tensor product.
- Any commutative monoid $(M, \cdot, 1)$ can be realized as a monoidal category with a single object. Recall that a category with a single object is the same thing as an ordinary monoid. By an Eckmann-Hilton argument, adding another monoidal product on $M$ requires the product to be commutative.

== Properties and associated notions ==
It follows from the three defining coherence conditions that a large class of diagrams (i.e. diagrams whose morphisms are built using $\alpha$, $\lambda$, $\rho$, identities and tensor product) commute: this is Mac Lane's "coherence theorem". It is sometimes inaccurately stated that all such diagrams commute.

There is a general notion of monoid object in a monoidal category, which generalizes the ordinary notion of monoid from abstract algebra. Ordinary monoids are precisely the monoid objects in the cartesian monoidal category Set. Further, any (small) strict monoidal category can be seen as a monoid object in the category of categories Cat (equipped with the monoidal structure induced by the cartesian product).

Monoidal functors are the functors between monoidal categories that preserve the tensor product and monoidal natural transformations are the natural transformations, between those functors, which are "compatible" with the tensor product.

Every monoidal category can be seen as the category B(∗, ∗) of a bicategory B with only one object, denoted ∗.

The concept of a category C enriched in a monoidal category M replaces the notion of a set of morphisms between pairs of objects in C with the notion of an M-object of morphisms between every two objects in C.

=== Free strict monoidal category ===
For every category C, the free strict monoidal category Σ(C) can be constructed as follows:

- its objects are lists (finite sequences) A_{1}, ..., A_{n} of objects of C;
- there are arrows between two objects A_{1}, ..., A_{m} and B_{1}, ..., B_{n} only if m = n, and then the arrows are lists (finite sequences) of arrows f_{1}: A_{1} → B_{1}, ..., f_{n}: A_{n} → B_{n} of C;
- the tensor product of two objects A_{1}, ..., A_{n} and B_{1}, ..., B_{m} is the concatenation A_{1}, ..., A_{n}, B_{1}, ..., B_{m} of the two lists, and, similarly, the tensor product of two morphisms is given by the concatenation of lists. The identity object is the empty list.

This operation Σ mapping category C to Σ(C) can be extended to a strict 2-monad on Cat.

== Specializations ==
- If, in a monoidal category, $A\otimes B$ and $B\otimes A$ are naturally isomorphic in a manner compatible with the coherence conditions, we speak of a braided monoidal category. If, moreover, this natural isomorphism is its own inverse, we have a symmetric monoidal category.
- A closed monoidal category is a monoidal category where the functor $X \mapsto X \otimes A$ has a right adjoint, which is called the "internal Hom-functor" $X \mapsto \mathrm{Hom}_{\mathbf C}(A , X)$. Examples include cartesian closed categories such as Set, the category of sets, and compact closed categories such as FdVect, the category of finite-dimensional vector spaces.
- Autonomous categories (or compact closed categories or rigid categories) are monoidal categories in which duals with nice properties exist; they abstract the idea of FdVect.
- Dagger symmetric monoidal categories, equipped with an extra dagger functor, abstracting the idea of FdHilb, finite-dimensional Hilbert spaces. These include the dagger compact categories.
- Tannakian categories are monoidal categories enriched over a field, which are very similar to representation categories of linear algebraic groups.

=== Preordered monoids ===
A preordered monoid is a monoidal category in which for every two objects $c, c'\in\mathrm{Ob}(\mathbf{C})$, there exists at most one morphism $c\to c'$ in C. In the context of preorders, a morphism $c\to c'$ is sometimes notated $c \leq c'$. The reflexivity and transitivity properties of an order, defined in the traditional sense, are incorporated into the categorical structure by the identity morphism and the composition formula in C, respectively. If $c\leq c'$ and $c'\leq c$, then the objects $c, c'$ are isomorphic which is notated $c\cong c'$.

Introducing a monoidal structure to the preorder C involves constructing

- an object $I\in\mathbf{C}$, called the monoidal unit, and
- a functor $\mathbf{C}\times\mathbf{C}\to\mathbf{C}$, denoted by "$\;\cdot\;$", called the monoidal multiplication.

$I$ and $\cdot$ must be unital and associative, up to isomorphism, meaning:

$(c_1\cdot c_2)\cdot c_3 \cong c_1\cdot (c_2\cdot c_3)$ and $I\cdot c \cong c\cong c\cdot I$.

As · is a functor,

if $c_1\to c_1'$ and $c_2\to c_2'$ then $(c_1\cdot c_2)\to (c_1'\cdot c_2')$.

The other coherence conditions of monoidal categories are fulfilled through the preorder structure as every diagram commutes in a preorder.

The natural numbers are an example of a monoidal preorder: having both a monoid structure (using + and 0) and a preorder structure (using ≤) forms a monoidal preorder as $m\leq n$ and $m'\leq n'$ implies $m+m'\leq n+n'$.

The free monoid on some generating set produces a monoidal preorder, producing the semi-Thue system.

== See also ==
- Skeleton (category theory)
- Spherical category
- Monoidal category action
