= Overcategory =

Category theory concept

In mathematics, an overcategory (also called a slice category) is a construction from category theory used in multiple contexts, such as with covering spaces (espace étalé). They were introduced as a mechanism for keeping track of data surrounding a fixed object $X$ in some category $\mathcal{C}$. The dual notion is that of an undercategory (also called a coslice category).

Both can be expressed in terms of the more general construction of a comma category.

== Definition ==
Let $\mathcal{C}$ be a category and $X$ a fixed object of $\mathcal{C}$^{pg 59}. The overcategory (also called a slice category) $\mathcal{C}/X$ is an associated category whose objects are pairs $(A, \pi)$ where $\pi:A \to X$ is a morphism in $\mathcal{C}$. Then, a morphism between objects $f:(A, \pi) \to (A', \pi')$ is given by a morphism $f:A \to A'$ in the category $\mathcal{C}$ such that the following diagram commutes

There is a dual notion called the undercategory (also called a coslice category) $X/\mathcal{C}$ whose objects are pairs $(B, \psi)$ where $\psi:X\to B$ is a morphism in $\mathcal{C}$. Then, morphisms in $X/\mathcal{C}$ are given by morphisms $g: B \to B'$ in $\mathcal{C}$ such that the following diagram commutes

These two notions have generalizations in 2-category theory and higher category theory^{pg 43}, with definitions either analogous or essentially the same.

== Properties ==
Many categorical properties of $\mathcal{C}$ are inherited by the associated over and undercategories for an object $X$. For example, if $\mathcal{C}$ has finite products and coproducts, it is immediate that the category $\mathcal{C}/X$ has finite coproducts and the category $X/\mathcal{C}$ has finite products, since the product and coproduct can be constructed in $\mathcal{C}$, and through universal properties, there exists a unique morphism either to $X$ or from $X$. In addition, this applies to limits and colimits as well.

By construction, $(X,\operatorname{id})$ is a terminal object of $\mathcal{C}/X$ and an initial object of $X/\mathcal{C}$.

== Examples ==
=== Overcategories on a site ===
Recall that a site $\mathcal{C}$ is a categorical generalization of a topological space first introduced by Grothendieck. One of the canonical examples comes directly from topology, where the category $\text{Open}(X)$ whose objects are open subsets $U$ of some topological space $X$, and the morphisms are given by inclusion maps. Then, for a fixed open subset $U$, the overcategory $\text{Open}(X)/U$ is canonically equivalent to the category $\text{Open}(U)$ for the induced topology on $U \subseteq X$. This is because every object in $\text{Open}(X)/U$ is an open subset $V$ contained in $U$.

=== Category of algebras as an undercategory ===
The category of commutative $A$-algebras is equivalent to the undercategory $A/\text{CRing}$ for the category of commutative rings. This is because the structure of an $A$-algebra on a commutative ring $B$ is directly encoded by a ring morphism $A \to B$. If we consider the opposite category, it is an overcategory of affine schemes, $\text{Aff}/\text{Spec}(A)$, or just $\text{Aff}_A$.

=== Overcategories of spaces ===
Another common overcategory considered in the literature are overcategories of spaces, such as schemes, smooth manifolds, or topological spaces. These categories encode objects relative to a fixed object, such as the category of schemes over $S$, $\text{Sch}/S$. Fiber products in these categories can be considered intersections (e.g. the scheme-theoretic intersection), given the objects are subobjects of the fixed object.
