= Cone (category theory) =

Construction in category theory

In category theory, a branch of mathematics, the cone of a functor is an abstract notion used to define the limit of that functor. Cones make other appearances in category theory as well.

== Definition ==
Let F : J → C be a diagram in C. Formally, a diagram is nothing more than a functor from J to C. The change in terminology reflects the fact that we think of F as indexing a family of objects and morphisms in C. The category J is thought of as an "index category". One should consider this in analogy with the concept of an indexed family of objects in set theory. The primary difference is that here we have morphisms as well. Thus, for example, when J is a discrete category, it corresponds most closely to the idea of an indexed family in set theory. Another common and more interesting example takes J to be a span. J can also be taken to be the empty category, leading to the simplest cones.

Let N be an object of C. A cone from N to F is a family of morphisms

$$\psi_X\colon N \to F(X)\,$$

for each object X of J, such that for every morphism f : X → Y in J the following diagram commutes:

Part of a cone from N to F

The (usually infinite) collection of all these triangles can be (partially) depicted in the shape of a cone with the apex N. The cone ψ is sometimes said to have vertex N and base F.

One can also define the dual notion of a cone from F to N (also called a co-cone) by reversing all the arrows above. Explicitly, a co-cone from F to N is a family of morphisms

$$\psi_X\colon F(X)\to N\,$$

for each object X of J, such that for every morphism f : X → Y in J the following diagram commutes:

Part of a cone from F to N

== Equivalent formulations ==
At first glance cones seem to be slightly abnormal constructions in category theory. They are maps from an object to a functor (or vice versa). In keeping with the spirit of category theory we would like to define them as morphisms or objects in some suitable category. In fact, we can do both.

Let J be a small category and let C^{J} be the category of diagrams of type J in C (this is nothing more than a functor category). Define the diagonal functor Δ : C → C^{J} as follows: Δ(N) : J → C is the constant functor to N for all N in C.

If F is a diagram of type J in C, the following statements are equivalent:

- ψ is a cone from N to F
- ψ is a natural transformation from Δ(N) to F
- (N, ψ) is an object in the comma category (Δ ↓ F)

The dual statements are also equivalent:

- ψ is a co-cone from F to N
- ψ is a natural transformation from F to Δ(N)
- (N, ψ) is an object in the comma category (F ↓ Δ)

These statements can all be verified by a straightforward application of the definitions. Thinking of cones as natural transformations we see that they are just morphisms in C^{J} with source (or target) a constant functor.

== Category of cones ==
By the above, we can define the category of cones to F as the comma category (Δ ↓ F). Morphisms of cones are then just morphisms in this category. This equivalence is rooted in the observation that a natural map between constant functors Δ(N), Δ(M) corresponds to a morphism between N and M. In this sense, the diagonal functor acts trivially on arrows. In similar vein, writing down the definition of a natural map from a constant functor Δ(N) to F yields the same diagram as the above. As one might expect, a morphism from a cone (N, ψ) to a cone (L, φ) is just a morphism N → L such that all the "obvious" diagrams commute (see the first diagram in the next section).

Likewise, the category of co-cones from F is the comma category (F ↓ Δ).

== Universal cones ==
Limits and colimits are defined as universal cones. That is, cones through which all other cones factor. A cone φ from L to F is a universal cone if for any other cone ψ from N to F there is a unique morphism from ψ to φ.

Equivalently, a universal cone to F is a universal morphism from Δ to F (thought of as an object in C^{J}), or a terminal object in (Δ ↓ F).

Dually, a cone φ from F to L is a universal cone if for any other cone ψ from F to N there is a unique morphism from φ to ψ.

Equivalently, a universal cone from F is a universal morphism from F to Δ, or an initial object in (F ↓ Δ).

The limit of F is a universal cone to F, and the colimit is a universal cone from F. As with all universal constructions, universal cones are not guaranteed to exist for all diagrams F, but if they do exist they are unique up to a unique isomorphism (in the comma category (Δ ↓ F)).

== See also ==
- Inverse limit#Cones – Construction in category theory
