= Thin category =

Category where each homset contains at most one morphism

In mathematics, specifically category theory, a thin category, or posetal category, is a category whose homsets each contain at most one morphism. As such, a thin category amounts to a preordered class (or a preordered set, if its objects form a set). A thin category that is skeletal (i.e. whose isomorphisms are endomorphisms) amounts to a partially ordered class (or a poset if the category is small). A thin category is sometimes assumed skeletal.

Equivalently, a thin category is a category enriched over the initial boolean algebra $2=\{0,1\}$ regarded as a cartesian monoidal category.

All diagrams commute in a thin category. When the commutative diagrams of a category are interpreted as a typed equational theory whose objects are the types, a codiscrete thin category corresponds to an inconsistent theory understood as one satisfying the axiom x = y at all types.

Viewing a 2-category as an enriched category whose hom-objects are categories, the hom-objects of any extension of a thin category to a 2-category having the same 1-cells are monoids.

Some lattice-theoretic structures are definable as (usually skeletal) thin categories of a certain kind. For example, under this assumption, a poset may be defined as a small skeletal thin category, a distributive lattice as a small skeletal thin distributive category, a Heyting algebra as a small skeletal thin finitely cocomplete cartesian closed category, and a Boolean algebra as a small skeletal thin finitely cocomplete *-autonomous category. Conversely, categories, distributive categories, finitely cocomplete cartesian closed categories, and finitely cocomplete *-autonomous categories can be considered the respective categorifications of posets, distributive lattices, Heyting algebras, and Boolean algebras.

== See also ==
- Category of preordered sets
