= Pointed set =

Basic concept in set theory

In mathematics, a pointed set (also based set or rooted set) is an ordered pair $(X, x_0)$ where $X$ is a set and $x_0$ is an element of $X$ called the base point (also spelled basepoint).

A map between pointed a sets $(X, x_0)$ and $(Y, y_0)$—called a based map, pointed map, or point-preserving map—is a function from $X$ to $Y$ that maps one basepoint to another, i.e. a map $f : X \to Y$ such that $f(x_0) = y_0$. A based map is usually denoted $f : (X, x_0) \to (Y, y_0)$.

Pointed sets are very simple algebraic structures. In the sense of universal algebra, a pointed set is a set $X$ together with a single nullary operation $*: X^0 \to X$, (Note: The notation X^{0} refers to the zeroth Cartesian power of the set X, which is a one-element set that contains the empty tuple.) which picks out the basepoint. Pointed maps are the homomorphisms of these algebraic structures.

The class of all pointed sets together with the class of all based maps forms a category. Every pointed set can be converted to an ordinary set by forgetting the basepoint (the forgetful functor is faithful), but the reverse is not true. In particular, the empty set cannot be pointed, because it has no element that can be chosen as the basepoint.

== Categorical properties ==
The category of pointed sets and based maps is equivalent to the category of sets and partial functions. The base point serves as a "default value" for those arguments for which the partial function is not defined. One textbook notes that "This formal completion of sets and partial maps by adding 'improper', 'infinite' elements was reinvented many times, in particular, in topology (one-point compactification) and in theoretical computer science." This category is also isomorphic to the coslice category ($\mathbf{1} \downarrow \mathbf{Set}$), where $\mathbf{1}$ is (a functor that selects) a singleton set, and $\scriptstyle {\mathbf{Set}}$ (the identity functor of) the category of sets. This coincides with the algebraic characterization, since the unique map $\mathbf{1} \to \mathbf{1}$ extends the commutative triangles defining arrows of the coslice category to form the commutative squares defining homomorphisms of the algebras.

There is a faithful functor from pointed sets to usual sets, but it is not full and these categories are not equivalent.

The category of pointed sets is a pointed category. The pointed singleton sets $(\{a\}, a)$ are both initial objects and terminal objects, i.e. they are zero objects. The category of pointed sets and pointed maps has both products and coproducts, but it is not a distributive category. It is also an example of a category where $0 \times A$ is not isomorphic to $0$.

== Applications ==
Many algebraic structures rely on a distinguished point. For example, groups are pointed sets by choosing the identity element as the basepoint, so that group homomorphisms are point-preserving maps. This observation can be restated in category theoretic terms as the existence of a forgetful functor from groups to pointed sets.

A pointed set may be seen as a pointed space under the discrete topology or as a vector space over the field with one element.

As "rooted set" the notion naturally appears in the study of antimatroids and transportation polytopes.

== See also ==
- Accessible pointed graph
- Alexandroff extension – Way to extend a non-compact topological space
- Riemann sphere – Model of the extended complex plane plus a point at infinity
