= Filtered category =

In category theory, filtered categories generalize the notion of directed set understood as a category (hence called a directed category; while some use directed category as a synonym for a filtered category). There is a dual notion of cofiltered category, which will be recalled below.

== Filtered categories ==
A category $J$ is filtered when

- it is not empty,
- for every two objects $j$ and $j'$ in $J$ there exists an object $k$ and two arrows $f:j\to k$ and $f':j'\to k$ in $J$,
- for every two parallel arrows $u,v:i\to j$ in $J$, there exists an object $k$ and an arrow $w:j\to k$ such that $wu=wv$.

A filtered colimit is a colimit of a functor $F:J\to C$ where $J$ is a filtered category.

== Cofiltered categories ==
A category $J$ is cofiltered if the opposite category $J^{\mathrm{op}}$ is filtered. In detail, a category is cofiltered when

- it is not empty,
- for every two objects $j$ and $j'$ in $J$ there exists an object $k$ and two arrows $f:k\to j$ and $f':k \to j'$ in $J$,
- for every two parallel arrows $u,v:j\to i$ in $J$, there exists an object $k$ and an arrow $w:k\to j$ such that $uw=vw$.

A cofiltered limit is a limit of a functor $F:J \to C$ where $J$ is a cofiltered category.

== Ind-objects and pro-objects ==
Given a small category $C$, a presheaf of sets $C^{op}\to Set$ that is a small filtered colimit of representable presheaves, is called an ind-object of the category $C$. Ind-objects of a category $C$ form a full subcategory $Ind(C)$ in the category of functors (presheaves) $C^{op}\to Set$. The category $Pro(C)=Ind(C^{op})^{op}$ of pro-objects in $C$ is the opposite of the category of ind-objects in the opposite category $C^{op}$.

== κ-filtered categories ==
There is a variant of "filtered category" known as a "κ-filtered category", defined as follows. This begins with the following observation: the three conditions in the definition of filtered category above say respectively that there exists a cocone over any diagram in $J$ of the form $\{\ \ \}\rightarrow J$, $\{j\ \ \ j'\}\rightarrow J$, or $\{i\rightrightarrows j\}\rightarrow J$. The existence of cocones for these three shapes of diagrams turns out to imply that cocones exist for any finite diagram; in other words, a category $J$ is filtered (according to the above definition) if and only if there is a cocone over any finite diagram $d: D\to J$.

Extending this, given a regular cardinal κ, a category $J$ is defined to be κ-filtered if there is a cocone over every diagram $d$ in $J$ of cardinality smaller than κ. (A small diagram is of cardinality κ if the morphism set of its domain is of cardinality κ.)

A κ-filtered colimit is a colimit of a functor $F:J\to C$ where $J$ is a κ-filtered category.
