= Distributive category =

In mathematics, a category is distributive if it has finite products and finite coproducts and such that for every choice of objects $A,B,C$, the canonical map

$$[\mathit{id}_A \times\iota_1, \mathit{id}_A \times\iota_2] : A\!\times\!B \,+ A\!\times\!C \to A\!\times\!(B+C)$$

is an isomorphism, and for all objects $A$, the canonical map $0 \to A\times 0$ is an isomorphism (where 0 denotes the initial object). Equivalently, if for every object $A$ the endofunctor $A \times -$ defined by $B\mapsto A\times B$ preserves coproducts up to isomorphisms $f$. It follows that $f$ and aforementioned canonical maps are equal for each choice of objects.

In particular, if the functor $A \times -$ has a right adjoint (i.e., if the category is cartesian closed), it necessarily preserves all colimits, and thus any cartesian closed category with finite coproducts (i.e., any bicartesian closed category) is distributive.

== Example ==
The category of sets is distributive. Let A, B, and C be sets. Then

$$\begin{align}
A\times (B\amalg C)
&= \{(a,d) \mid a \in A\text{ and }d \in B \amalg C\} \\
&\cong \{(a,d) \mid a \in A\text{ and }d \in B\} \amalg \{(a,d) \mid a \in A\text{ and }d \in C\} \\
&= (A \times B) \amalg (A \times C)
\end{align}$$

where $\amalg$ denotes the coproduct in Set, namely the disjoint union, and $\cong$ denotes a bijection. In the case where A, B, and C are finite sets, this result reflects the distributive property: the above sets each have cardinality $|A|\cdot (|B|+|C|)=|A|\cdot|B| + |A|\cdot|C|$.

The categories Grp and Ab are not distributive, even though they have both products and coproducts.

An even simpler category that has both products and coproducts but is not distributive is the category of pointed sets.
