= Diagonal morphism =

In category theory, a branch of mathematics, for every object $A$ in every category $\mathcal{C}$ where the product $A\times A$ exists, there exists the diagonal morphism

$$\delta_A : A \rightarrow A \times A$$

satisfying

$\pi_k \circ \delta_A = \operatorname{id}_A$ for $k \in \{ 1,2 \},$

where $\pi_k$ is the canonical projection morphism to the $k$-th component. The existence of this morphism is a consequence of the universal property that characterizes the product (up to isomorphism). The restriction to binary products here is for ease of notation; diagonal morphisms exist similarly for arbitrary products. The image of a diagonal morphism in the category of sets, as a subset of the Cartesian product, is a relation on the domain, namely equality.

For concrete categories, the diagonal morphism can be simply described by its action on elements $x$ of the object $A$. Namely, $\delta_A(x) = \langle x,x \rangle$, the ordered pair formed from $x$. The reason for the name is that the image of such a diagonal morphism is diagonal (whenever it makes sense), for example the image of the diagonal morphism $\mathbb{R} \rightarrow \mathbb{R}^2$ on the real line is given by the line that is the graph of the equation $y=x$. The diagonal morphism into the infinite product $X^\infty$ may provide an injection into the space of sequences valued in $X$; each element maps to the constant sequence at that element. However, most notions of sequence spaces have convergence restrictions that the image of the diagonal map will fail to satisfy.

The dual notion of a diagonal morphism is a codiagonal morphism. For every object $B$ in a category $\mathcal{C}$ where the coproducts $B \sqcup B$ exists, the codiagonal is the canonical morphism

$$\delta_B \colon  B \sqcup B \stackrel{[Id,Id]}  \to B$$

satisfying

$\delta_B \circ \tau_l = \operatorname{id}_B$ for $l \in \{ 1,2 \}.$

where $\tau_l$ is the injection morphism to the $l$-th component.

== See also ==
- Diagonal functor
- Diagonal embedding
- wikibooks:Category Theory/(Co-)cones and (co-)limits

== Bibliography ==
- Awodey, s. (1996). "Structure in Mathematics and Logic: A Categorical Perspective". Philosophia Mathematica. 4 (3): 209–237. doi:10.1093/philmat/4.3.209.
- Baez, John C. (2004). "Quantum Quandaries: A Category-Theoretic Perspective". The Structural Foundations of Quantum Gravity. pp. 240–265. arXiv:quant-ph/0404040. Bibcode:2004quant.ph..4040B. doi:10.1093/acprof:oso/9780199269693.003.0008. ISBN 978-0-19-926969-3.
- Carter, J. Scott; Crans, Alissa; Elhamdadi, Mohamed; Saito, Masahico (2008). "Cohomology of Categorical Self-Distributivity" (PDF). Journal of Homotopy and Related Structures. 3 (1): 13–63. arXiv:math/0607417. Bibcode:2006math......7417C.
- Faith, Carl (1973). "Product and Coproduct". Algebra. pp. 83–109. doi:10.1007/978-3-642-80634-6_4. ISBN 978-3-642-80636-0.
- Kashiwara, Msakia; Schapira, Pierre (2006). "Limits". Categories and Sheaves. Grundlehren der mathematischen Wissenschaften. Vol. 332. pp. 35–69. doi:10.1007/3-540-27950-4_3. ISBN 978-3-540-27949-5.
- Mitchell, Barry (1965). Theory of Categories. Academic Press. ISBN 978-0-12-499250-4.
- Masakatsu, Uzawa (1972). "Some categorical properties of complex spaces Part II" (PDF). Bulletin of the Faculty of Education, Chiba University. 21: 83–93. ISSN 0577-6856.
- Popescu, Nicolae; Popescu, Liliana (1979). "Categories and functors". Theory of categories. pp. 1–148. doi:10.1007/978-94-009-9550-5_1. ISBN 978-94-009-9552-9.
- Pupier, R. (1964). "Petit guide des catégories". Publications du Département de Mathématiques (Lyon) (in French). 1 (1): 1–18.
