= Coequalizer =

Aspect of category theory

In category theory, a coequalizer (or coequaliser) is a generalization of the quotient of a set by an equivalence relation to objects in an arbitrary category. It is the categorical construction dual to the equalizer.

== Definition ==
A coequalizer is the colimit of a diagram consisting of two objects X and Y and two parallel morphisms f, g : X → Y.

More explicitly, a coequalizer of the parallel morphisms f and g can be defined as an object Q together with a morphism q : Y → Q such that q ∘ f = q ∘ g. Moreover, the pair (Q, q) must be universal in the sense that given any other such pair (Q′, q′) there exists a unique morphism u : Q → Q′ such that u ∘ q = q′. This information can be captured by the following commutative diagram:

As with all universal constructions, a coequalizer, if it exists, is unique up to a unique isomorphism (this is why, by abuse of language, one sometimes speaks of "the" coequalizer of two parallel arrows).

It can be shown that a coequalizing arrow q is an epimorphism in any category.

== Examples ==
- In the category of sets, the coequalizer of two functions f, g : X → Y is the quotient of Y by the smallest equivalence relation ~ such that for every x ∈ X, we have f(x) ~ g(x). In particular, if R is an equivalence relation on a set Y, and r_{1}, r_{2} are the natural projections (R ⊂ Y × Y) → Y then the coequalizer of r_{1} and r_{2} is the quotient set Y / R. (See also: quotient by an equivalence relation.)
- The coequalizer in the category of groups is very similar. Here if f, g : X → Y are group homomorphisms, their coequalizer is the quotient of Y by the normal closure of the set
  $$S=\{f(x)g(x)^{-1}\mid x\in X\}$$
- For abelian groups the coequalizer is particularly simple. It is just the factor group Y / im(f – g). (This is the cokernel of the morphism f – g; see the next section).
- In the category of topological spaces, the circle object S^{1} can be viewed as the coequalizer of the two inclusion maps from the standard 0-simplex to the standard 1-simplex.
- Coequalizers can be large: There are exactly two functors from the category 1 having one object and one identity arrow, to the category 2 with two objects and one non-identity arrow going between them. The coequalizer of these two functors is the monoid of natural numbers under addition, considered as a one-object category. In particular, this shows that while every coequalizing arrow is epic, it is not necessarily surjective.

== Properties ==
- Every coequalizer is an epimorphism.
- In a topos, every epimorphism is the coequalizer of its kernel pair.

== Special cases ==
In categories with zero morphisms, one can define a cokernel of a morphism f as the coequalizer of f and the parallel zero morphism.

In preadditive categories it makes sense to add and subtract morphisms (the hom-sets actually form abelian groups). In such categories, one can define the coequalizer of two morphisms f and g as the cokernel of their difference:

coeq(f, g) = coker(g – f).

A stronger notion is that of an absolute coequalizer, this is a coequalizer that is preserved under all functors. Formally, an absolute coequalizer of a pair of parallel arrows f, g : X → Y in a category C is a coequalizer as defined above, but with the added property that given any functor F : C → D, F(Q) together with F(q) is the coequalizer of F(f) and F(g) in the category D. Split coequalizers are examples of absolute coequalizers.

== See also ==
- Coproduct
- Pushout
