= Diagonal functor =

In category theory, a branch of mathematics, the diagonal functor $\mathcal{C} \rightarrow \mathcal{C} \times \mathcal{C}$ is given by $\Delta(a) = \langle a,a \rangle$, which maps objects as well as morphisms. This functor can be employed to give a succinct alternate description of the product of objects within the category $\mathcal{C}$: a product $a \times b$ is a universal arrow from $\Delta$ to $\langle a,b \rangle$. The arrow comprises the projection maps.

More generally, given a small index category $\mathcal{J}$, one may construct the functor category $\mathcal{C}^\mathcal{J}$, the objects of which are called diagrams. For each object $a$ in $\mathcal{C}$, there is a constant diagram $\Delta_a : \mathcal{J} \to \mathcal{C}$ that maps every object in $\mathcal{J}$ to $a$ and every morphism in $\mathcal{J}$ to $1_a$. The diagonal functor $\Delta : \mathcal{C} \rightarrow \mathcal{C}^\mathcal{J}$ assigns to each object $a$ of $\mathcal{C}$ the diagram $\Delta_a$, and to each morphism $f: a \rightarrow b$ in $\mathcal{C}$ the natural transformation $\eta$ in $\mathcal{C}^\mathcal{J}$ (given for every object $j$ of $\mathcal{J}$ by $\eta_j = f$). Thus, for example, in the case that $\mathcal{J}$ is a discrete category with two objects, the diagonal functor $\mathcal{C} \rightarrow \mathcal{C} \times \mathcal{C}$ is recovered.

Diagonal functors provide a way to define limits and colimits of diagrams. Given a diagram $\mathcal{F} : \mathcal{J} \rightarrow \mathcal{C}$, a natural transformation $\Delta_a \to \mathcal{F}$ (for some object $a$ of $\mathcal{C}$) is called a cone for $\mathcal{F}$. These cones and their factorizations correspond precisely to the objects and morphisms of the comma category $(\Delta\downarrow\mathcal{F})$, and a limit of $\mathcal{F}$ is a terminal object in $(\Delta\downarrow\mathcal{F})$, i.e., a universal arrow $\Delta \rightarrow \mathcal{F}$. Dually, a colimit of $\mathcal{F}$ is an initial object in the comma category $(\mathcal{F}\downarrow\Delta)$, i.e., a universal arrow $\mathcal{F} \rightarrow \Delta$.

If every functor from $\mathcal{J}$ to $\mathcal{C}$ has a limit (which will be the case if $\mathcal{C}$ is complete), then the operation of taking limits is itself a functor from $\mathcal{C}^\mathcal{J}$ to $\mathcal{C}$. The limit functor is the right-adjoint of the diagonal functor. Similarly, the colimit functor (which exists if the category is cocomplete) is the left-adjoint of the diagonal functor. For example, the diagonal functor $\mathcal{C} \rightarrow \mathcal{C} \times \mathcal{C}$ described above is the left-adjoint of the binary product functor and the right-adjoint of the binary coproduct functor.

== See also ==
- Diagram (category theory)
- Cone (category theory)
- Diagonal morphism
