= Primordial element (algebra) =

In algebra, a primordial element is a particular kind of a vector in a vector space.

== Definition ==
Let $V$ be a vector space over a field $\mathbb{F}$ and let $\left(e_i\right)_{i \in I}$ be an $I$-indexed basis of vectors for $V.$ By the definition of a basis, every vector $v \in V$ can be expressed uniquely as $v = \sum_{i \in I} a_i(v) e_i$ for some $I$-indexed family of scalars $\left(a_i\right)_{i \in I}$ where all but finitely many $a_i$ are zero. Let $I(v) = \left\{i \in I : a_i(v) \neq 0\right\}$ denote the set of all indices for which the expression of $v$ has a nonzero coefficient. Given a subspace $W$ of $V,$ a nonzero vector $p \in W$ is said to be primordial if it has both of the following two properties:

1. $I(p)$ is minimal among the sets $I(w),$ where $0 \neq w \in W,$ and
2. $a_i(p) = 1$ for some index $i.$
