= Basepoint =

Basepoint may refer to:

- In mathematics, a point singled out in a:
  - Pointed set
  - Pointed space
- In the baseline (sea) for a state's territorial waters, any of the defining points of land

== See also ==
- Origin (mathematics)
