= Final functor =

In category theory, the notion of final functor is a generalization of the notion of cofinal set from order theory.

A functor $F: C \to D$ is called final if, for any set-valued functor $G: D \to \textbf{Set}$, the colimit of G is the same as the colimit of $G \circ F$. The inclusion function of a cofinal subset into a partially ordered set is a final functor.

The notion of initial functor is defined as above, replacing final by initial and colimit by limit.

== Terminology ==
The prefix "co-" in the term "cofinal" is used in the sense of "together with", similar to its use in the word "covariant". However, the prefix "co" in category theory has a conflicting meaning, indicating the dualized form of a concept obtained by passing to the opposite category, and so the word "cofinal" could easily be misinterpreted to mean "dual to final". The term "final" as it is used in this article historically arises from modifying the term "cofinal" to avoid confusion over the meaning of the prefix.
