= Limits and colimits in an ∞-category =

In mathematics, especially category theory, limits and colimits in an ∞-category generalize limits and colimits in a category. Like the counterparts in ordinary category theory, they play fundamental roles in constructions (e.g., Kan extensions) as well as characterizations (e.g., sheaf conditions) in higher category theory.

== Definition ==
Let $I$ be a simplicial set and $C$ an ∞-category (a weak Kan complex). Fix a Grothendieck universe. Then, roughly, a limit of a functor $f : I \to C$ amounts to the following isomorphism:

$$\operatorname{Hom}(a_{\textrm{const}}, f) \overset{\sim}\to \operatorname{Hom}(a, \varprojlim f)$$

functorially in $a$, where $a_{\textrm{const}} : I \to C$ denotes the constant functor with value $a$.

A typical case is when $I = \Delta$ is the simplex category or rather its opposite; in the latter case, the functor $f$ is commonly called a simplicial diagram.

== Facts ==
The ordinary category of sets has small limits and colimits. Similarly,

- The ∞-category of ∞-categories and the ∞-category of Kan complexes both have all small limits and colimits.
- The presheaf category $\mathcal{P}(C) = \textbf{Fct}(C, \textbf{Kan})$ on an ∞-category C has colimits, as a consequence of the above.

Also, many of standard facts about limits and colimits in a category continue to hold for those in an ∞-category.

- An ∞-category has all small limits if and only if it has coequalizers and small coproducts.
- If a functor admits a left adjoint, then it commutes with all limits.
