= Preordered class =

Class equipped with a preorder

In mathematics, a preordered class is a class equipped with a preorder.

== Definition ==
When dealing with a class C, it is possible to define a class relation on C as a subclass of the power class C $\times$ C . Then, it is convenient to use the language of relations on a set.

A preordered class is a class with a preorder on it. Partially ordered class and totally ordered class are defined in a similar way. These concepts generalize respectively those of preordered set, partially ordered set and totally ordered set. However, it is difficult to work with them as in the small case because many constructions common in a set theory are no longer possible in this framework.

Equivalently, a preordered class is a thin category, that is, a category with at most one morphism from an object to another.

== Examples ==
- In any category C, when D is a class of morphisms of C containing identities and closed under composition, the relation 'there exists a D-morphism from X to Y' is a preorder on the class of objects of C.
- The class Ord of all ordinals is a totally ordered class with the classical ordering of ordinals.
