= Inverse limit =

Construction in category theory

In mathematics, an inverse limit (also called a projective limit) is a construction that allows one to "glue together" several related objects, the precise gluing process being specified by morphisms between the objects. Inverse limits can be defined in any category, although their existence depends on the category that is considered. They are a special case of the concept of a limit in category theory.

By working in the dual category—that is, by reversing the arrows—an inverse limit becomes a direct limit or inductive limit, and a limit becomes a colimit.

== Formal definition ==
=== Algebraic objects ===
We start with the definition of an inverse system (or projective system) of groups and homomorphisms. Let $(I, \leq)$ be a directed poset (not all authors require I to be directed). Let $(A_i)_{i\in I}$ be a family of groups and suppose we have a family of homomorphisms $f_{ij}: A_j \to A_i$ for all $i \leq j$ (note the order) with the following properties:

1. $f_{ii}$ is the identity on $A_i$,
2. $f_{ik} = f_{ij} \circ f_{jk}$ for all $i \leq j \leq k.$

Then the pair $((A_i)_{i\in I}, (f_{ij})_{i\leq j\in I})$ is called an inverse system of groups and morphisms over $I$, and the morphisms $f_{ij}$ are called the transition morphisms of the system.

The inverse limit of the inverse system $((A_i)_{i\in I}, (f_{ij})_{i\leq j\in I})$ is the subgroup of the direct product of the $A_i$'s defined as

$$A = \varprojlim_{i\in I}{A_i} = \left\{\;\left.\vec a \in \prod_{i\in I}A_i \;\right|\; a_i = f_{ij}(a_j) \text{ for all } i \leq j \text{ in } I\;\right\}.$$

The definition above of an inverse system implies that $A$ is closed under pointwise multiplication, and therefore a group, since

$$f_{ij}(a_j\cdot b_j)=f_{ij}(a_j)\cdot f_{ij}(b_j)=a_i\cdot b_i$$

for all $i<j$ and every $\vec a, \vec b\in A$

The inverse limit $A$ comes equipped with natural projections π_{i}: A → A_{i} which pick out the ith component of the direct product for each $i$ in $I$. The inverse limit and the natural projections satisfy a universal property described in the next section.

This same construction may be carried out if the $A_i$'s are sets, semigroups, topological spaces, rings, modules (over a fixed ring), algebras (over a fixed ring), etc., and the homomorphisms are morphisms in the corresponding category. The inverse limit will also belong to that category. More generally, this construction applies when the $A_i$ belong to a variety in the sense of universal algebra, that is, a type of algebraic structures, whose axioms are unconditional (fields do not form an algebra, since zero does not have a multiplicative inverse).

=== General definition ===
The inverse limit can be defined abstractly in an arbitrary category by means of a universal property. Let $(X_i, f_{ij})$ be an inverse system of objects and morphisms in a category C (same definition as above). The inverse limit of this system is an object X in C together with morphisms π_{i}: X → X_{i} (called projections) satisfying π_{i} = $f_{ij}$ ∘ π_{j} for all i ≤ j. The pair (X, π_{i}) must be universal in the sense that for any other such pair (Y, ψ_{i}) there exists a unique morphism u: Y → X such that the diagram

commutes for all i ≤ j. The inverse limit is often denoted

$$X = \varprojlim X_i$$

with the inverse system $(X_i, f_{ij})$ and the canonical projections $\pi_i$ being understood.

In some categories, the inverse limit of certain inverse systems does not exist. If it does, however, it is unique in a strong sense: given any two inverse limits X and X' of an inverse system, there exists a unique isomorphism X′ → X commuting with the projection maps.

Inverse systems and inverse limits in a category C admit an alternative description in terms of functors. Any partially ordered set I can be considered as a small category where the morphisms consist of arrows i → j if and only if i ≤ j. An inverse system is then just a contravariant functor I → C. Let $C^{I^\mathrm{op}}$ be the category of these functors (with natural transformations as morphisms). An object X of C can be considered a trivial inverse system, where all objects are equal to X and all arrow are the identity of X. This defines a "trivial functor" from C to $C^{I^\mathrm{op}}.$ The inverse limit, if it exists, is defined as a right adjoint of this trivial functor.

== Examples ==
- The ring of p-adic integers is the inverse limit of the rings $\mathbb{Z}/p^n\mathbb{Z}$ (see modular arithmetic) with the index set being the natural numbers with the usual order, and the morphisms being "take remainder". That is, one considers sequences of integers $(n_1, n_2, \dots)$ such that each element of the sequence "projects" down to the previous ones, namely, that $n_i\equiv n_j \mbox{ mod } p^{i}$ whenever $i<j.$ The natural topology on the p-adic integers is the one implied here, namely the product topology with cylinder sets as the open sets.
- The p-adic solenoid is the inverse limit of the topological groups $\mathbb{R}/p^n\mathbb{Z}$ with the index set being the natural numbers with the usual order, and the morphisms being "take remainder". That is, one considers sequences of real numbers $(x_1, x_2, \dots)$ such that each element of the sequence "projects" down to the previous ones, namely, that $x_i\equiv x_j \mbox{ mod } p^{i}$ whenever $i<j.$ Its elements are exactly of form $n + r$, where $n$ is a p-adic integer, and $r\in [0, 1)$ is the "remainder".
- The ring $\textstyle R[[t]]$ of formal power series over a commutative ring R can be thought of as the inverse limit of the rings $\textstyle R[t]/t^nR[t]$, indexed by the natural numbers as usually ordered, with the morphisms from $\textstyle R[t]/t^{n+j}R[t]$ to $\textstyle R[t]/t^nR[t]$ given by the natural projection.
- Pro-finite groups are defined as inverse limits of (discrete) finite groups.
- Let the index set I of an inverse system (X_{i}, $f_{ij}$) have a greatest element m. Then the natural projection π_{m}: X → X_{m} is an isomorphism.
- In the category of sets, every inverse system has an inverse limit, which can be constructed in an elementary manner as a subset of the product of the sets forming the inverse system. The inverse limit of any inverse system of non-empty finite sets is non-empty. This is a generalization of Kőnig's lemma in graph theory and may be proved with Tychonoff's theorem, viewing the finite sets as compact discrete spaces, and then applying the finite intersection property characterization of compactness.
- In the category of topological spaces, every inverse system has an inverse limit. It is constructed by placing the initial topology (with respect to the projection maps into the constituent spaces of the inverse system) on the underlying set-theoretic inverse limit. This is known as the limit topology.
  - The set of infinite strings is the inverse limit of the set of finite strings, and is thus endowed with the limit topology. As the original spaces are discrete, the limit space is totally disconnected. This is one way of realizing the p-adic numbers and the Cantor set (as infinite strings).

== Derived functors of the inverse limit ==
For an abelian category C, the inverse limit functor

$$\varprojlim:C^I\rightarrow C$$

is left exact. If I is ordered (not simply partially ordered) and countable, and C is the category Ab of abelian groups, the Mittag-Leffler condition is a condition on the transition morphisms f_{ij} that ensures the exactness of $\varprojlim$. Specifically, Eilenberg constructed a functor

$$\varprojlim{}^1:\operatorname{Ab}^I\rightarrow\operatorname{Ab}$$

(pronounced "lim one") such that if (A_{i}, f_{ij}), (B_{i}, g_{ij}), and (C_{i}, h_{ij}) are three inverse systems of abelian groups, and

$$0\rightarrow A_i\rightarrow B_i\rightarrow C_i\rightarrow0$$

is a short exact sequence of inverse systems, then

$$0\rightarrow\varprojlim A_i\rightarrow\varprojlim B_i\rightarrow\varprojlim C_i\rightarrow\varprojlim{}^1A_i$$

is an exact sequence in Ab.

=== Mittag-Leffler condition ===
If the ranges of the morphisms of an inverse system of abelian groups (A_{i}, f_{ij}) are stationary, that is, for every k there exists j ≥ k such that for all i ≥ j :$f_{kj}(A_j)=f_{ki}(A_i)$ one says that the system satisfies the Mittag-Leffler condition.

The name "Mittag-Leffler" for this condition was given by Bourbaki in their chapter on uniform structures for a similar result about inverse limits of complete Hausdorff uniform spaces. Mittag-Leffler used a similar argument in the proof of Mittag-Leffler's theorem.

The following situations are examples where the Mittag-Leffler condition is satisfied:

- a system in which the morphisms f_{ij} are surjective
- a system of finite-dimensional vector spaces or finite abelian groups or modules of finite length or Artinian modules.

An example where $\varprojlim{}^1$ is non-zero is obtained by taking I to be the non-negative integers, letting A_{i} = p^{i}Z, B_{i} = Z, and C_{i} = B_{i} / A_{i} = Z/p^{i}Z. Then

$$\varprojlim{}^1A_i=\mathbf{Z}_p/\mathbf{Z}$$

where Z_{p} denotes the p-adic integers.

=== Further results ===
More generally, if C is an arbitrary abelian category that has enough injectives, then so does C^{I}, and the right derived functors of the inverse limit functor can thus be defined. The nth right derived functor is denoted

$$R^n\varprojlim:C^I\rightarrow C.$$

In the case where C satisfies Grothendieck's axiom (AB4*), Jan-Erik Roos generalized the functor lim^{1} on Ab^{I} to series of functors lim^{n} such that

$$\varprojlim{}^n\cong R^n\varprojlim.$$

It was thought for almost 40 years that Roos had proved (in Sur les foncteurs dérivés de lim. Applications.) that lim^{1} A_{i} = 0 for (A_{i}, f_{ij}) an inverse system with surjective transition morphisms and I the set of non-negative integers (such inverse systems are often called "Mittag-Leffler sequences"). However, in 2002, Amnon Neeman and Pierre Deligne constructed an example of such a system in a category satisfying (AB4) (in addition to (AB4*)) with lim^{1} A_{i} ≠ 0. Roos has since shown (in "Derived functors of inverse limits revisited") that his result is correct if C has a set of generators (in addition to satisfying (AB3) and (AB4*)).

Barry Mitchell has shown (in "The cohomological dimension of a directed set") that if I has cardinality $\aleph_d$ (the dth infinite cardinal), then R^{n}lim is zero for all n ≥ d + 2. This applies to the I-indexed diagrams in the category of R-modules, with R a commutative ring; it is not necessarily true in an arbitrary abelian category (see Roos' "Derived functors of inverse limits revisited" for examples of abelian categories in which lim^{n}, on diagrams indexed by a countable set, is nonzero for n > 1).

== Related concepts and generalizations ==
The categorical dual of an inverse limit is a direct limit (or inductive limit). More general concepts are the limits and colimits of category theory. The terminology is somewhat confusing: inverse limits are a class of limits, while direct limits are a class of colimits.
