= Amnestic functor =

In the mathematical field of category theory, an amnestic functor F : A → B is a functor for which an A-isomorphism ƒ is an identity whenever Fƒ is an identity.

An example of a functor which is not amnestic is the forgetful functor Met_{c}→Top from the category of metric spaces with continuous functions for morphisms to the category of topological spaces. If $d_1$ and $d_2$ are equivalent metrics on a space $X$ then $\operatorname{id}\colon(X, d_1)\to(X, d_2)$ is an isomorphism that covers the identity, but is not an identity morphism (its domain and codomain are not equal).
