= Discrete category =

Category whose only morphisms are the identity morphisms

In mathematics, in the field of category theory, a discrete category is a category whose only morphisms are the identity morphisms:

hom_{C}(X, X) = {id_{X}} for all objects X
hom_{C}(X, Y) = ∅ for all objects X ≠ Y

Since by axioms, there is always the identity morphism between the same object, we can express the above as condition on the cardinality of the hom-set

| hom_{C}(X, Y) | is 1 when X = Y and 0 when X is not equal to Y.

Some authors prefer a weaker notion, where a discrete category merely needs to be equivalent to such a category.

== Simple facts ==
Any class of objects defines a discrete category when augmented with identity maps.

Any subcategory of a discrete category is discrete. Also, a category is discrete if and only if all of its subcategories are full.

The limit of any functor from a discrete category into another category is called a product, while the colimit is called a coproduct. Thus, for example, the discrete category with just two objects can be used as a diagram or diagonal functor to define a product or coproduct of two objects. Alternately, for a general category C and the discrete category 2, one can consider the functor category C^{2}. The diagrams of 2 in this category are pairs of objects, and the limit of the diagram is the product.

The functor from Set to Cat that sends a set to the corresponding discrete category is left adjoint to the functor sending a small category to its set of objects. (For the right adjoint, see indiscrete category.)
