= Indiscrete category =

Category with exactly one morphism between any two objects

In category theory, a branch of mathematics, an indiscrete category is a category in which there is exactly one morphism between any two objects. Every class X gives rise to an indiscrete category whose objects are the elements of X such that for any two objects A and B, there is only one morphism from A to B. Any two nonempty indiscrete categories are equivalent to each other. The functor from Set to Cat that sends a set to the corresponding indiscrete category is right adjoint to the functor that sends a small category to its set of objects.
