= Indexed family =

Collection of objects, associated with an index set

In mathematics, a family, or indexed family, is a collection of objects, each associated with an element, known as an index, that belongs to some index set.

For example, a family of real numbers, indexed by the set of integers, is a collection of real numbers, where a given function selects one real number for each integer (possibly the same) as indexing.

More formally, an indexed family is a mathematical function together with its domain $I$ and image $X$ (that is, indexed families and mathematical functions are technically identical, just points of view are different). Often the elements of the set $X$ are referred to as making up the family. In this view, an indexed family is interpreted as a collection of indexed elements, instead of a function. The set $I$ is called the index set of the family, and $X$ is the indexed set.

Sequences are one type of families indexed by natural numbers. In general, the index set $I$ is not restricted to be countable. For example, one could consider an uncountable family of subsets of the natural numbers indexed by the real numbers.

== Definition ==
Let $I$ and $X$ be sets. A family of elements of $X$ indexed by $I$, denoted $(x_i)_{i\in I}$, is a function $f:I\to X$ such that
$$f(i)= x_i$$
for all $i \in I$. The element $x_i$ is known as the term of index $i$. Notation using different brackets, such as $\{x_i\}_{i\in I}$ is also valid.

Functions and indexed families are formally equivalent, since any function $f$ with a domain $I$ induces a family $(f(i))_{i \in I}$ and conversely. (The terms "mapping" for functions and "indexing" for indexed families are equivalent.) Being an element of a family is equivalent to being in the range of the corresponding function. In practice, however, a family is viewed as a collection, rather than a function.

Any set $X$ gives rise to a family $\left(x_t\right)_{t \in X},$ where $X$ is indexed by itself (meaning that $f$ is the identity function). However, families differ from sets in that the same object can appear multiple times with different indices in a family, whereas a set is a collection of distinct objects. A family contains any element exactly once if and only if the corresponding function is injective.

An indexed family $\left(x_i\right)_{i \in I}$ defines a set $\mathcal{X} = \{x_i : i \in I\},$ that is, the image of $I$ under $f.$ Since the mapping $f$ is not required to be injective, there may exist $i, j \in I$ with $i \neq j$ such that $x_i = x_j.$ Thus, $| \mathcal{X}| \leq |I|$, where $|A|$ denotes the cardinality of the set $A.$ For example, the sequence $\left( (-1)^i \right)_{i\in \N}$ indexed by the natural numbers $\N = \{1, 2, 3, \ldots\}$ has image set $\left\{(-1)^i : i \in \N\right\} = \{-1,1\}.$ In addition, the set $\{ x_i : i \in I \}$ does not carry information about any structures on $I.$ Hence, by using a set instead of the family, some information might be lost. For example, an ordering on the index set of a family induces an ordering on the family, but no ordering on the corresponding image set.

=== Indexed subfamily ===
An indexed family $\left(B_i\right)_{i \in J}$ is a subfamily of an indexed family $\left(A_i\right)_{i \in I},$ if and only if $J$ is a subset of $I$ and $B_i = A_i$ holds for all $i \in J.$

== Examples ==
=== Indexed vectors ===
For example, consider the following sentence:

The vectors $v_1, \ldots, v_n$ are linearly independent.

Here $\left(v_i\right)_{i \in \{1, \ldots, n\}}$ denotes a family of vectors. The $i$-th vector $v_i$ only makes sense with respect to this family, as sets are unordered so there is no $i$-th vector of a set. Furthermore, linear independence is defined as a property of a collection; it therefore is important if those vectors are linearly independent as a set or as a family. For example, if we consider $n = 2$ and $v_1 = v_2 = (1, 0)$ as the same vector, then the set of them consists of only one element (as a set is a collection of unordered distinct elements) and is linearly independent, but the family contains the same element twice (since indexed differently) and is linearly dependent (same vectors are linearly dependent).

=== Matrices ===
Suppose a text states the following:

A square matrix $A$ is invertible, if and only if the rows of $A$ are linearly independent.

As in the previous example, it is important that the rows of $A$ are linearly independent as a family, not as a set. For example, consider the matrix
$$A = \begin{bmatrix} 1 & 1 \\ 1 & 1 \end{bmatrix}.$$
The set of the rows consists of a single element $(1, 1)$ as a set is made of unique elements so it is linearly independent, but the matrix is not invertible as the matrix determinant is 0. On the other hand, the family of the rows contains two elements indexed differently such as the 1st row $(1, 1)$ and the 2nd row $(1, 1)$ so it is linearly dependent. The statement is therefore correct if it refers to the family of rows, but wrong if it refers to the set of rows. (The statement is also correct when "the rows" is interpreted as referring to a multiset, in which the elements are also kept distinct but which lacks some of the structure of an indexed family.)

=== Other examples ===
Let $\mathbf{n}$ be the finite set $\{1, 2, \ldots n\},$ where $n$ is a positive integer.

- An ordered pair (2-tuple) is a family indexed by the set of two elements, $\mathbf{2} = \{1, 2\};$ each element of the ordered pair is indexed by an element of the set $\mathbf{2}.$
- An $n$-tuple is a family indexed by the set $\mathbf{n}.$
- An infinite sequence is a family indexed by the natural numbers.
- A list is an $n$-tuple for an unspecified $n,$ or an infinite sequence.
- An $n \times m$ matrix is a family indexed by the Cartesian product $\mathbf{n} \times \mathbf{m}$ which elements are ordered pairs; for example, $(2, 5)$ indexing the matrix element at the 2nd row and the 5th column.
- A net is a family indexed by a directed set.

== Operations on indexed families ==
Index sets are often used in sums and other similar operations. For example, if $\left(a_i\right)_{i \in I}$ is an indexed family of numbers, the sum of all those numbers is denoted by
$$\sum_{i \in I} a_i.$$

When $\left(A_i\right)_{i \in I}$ is a family of sets, the union of all those sets is denoted by
$$\bigcup_{i \in I} A_i.$$

Likewise for intersections and Cartesian products.

== Usage in category theory ==
The analogous concept in category theory is called a diagram. A diagram is a functor giving rise to an indexed family of objects in a category C, indexed by another category J, and related by morphisms depending on two indices.

== See also ==
- Array data type – Data type that represents an ordered collection of elements (values or variables)
- Coproduct – Category-theoretic construction
- Diagram (category theory) – Indexed collection of objects and morphisms in a category
- Disjoint union – In mathematics, operation on sets
- Family of sets – Any collection of sets, or subsets of a set
- Index notation – Manner of referring to elements of arrays or tensors
- Net (mathematics) – Generalization of a sequence of points
- Parametric family
- Sequence – Finite or infinite ordered list of elements
- Tagged union – Union data structure with enforced cases
