= Applied category theory =

Applications of category theory

Applied category theory is an academic discipline in which methods from category theory are used to study other fields including but not limited to computer science, physics (in particular quantum mechanics), natural language processing, control theory, probability theory and causality. The application of category theory in these domains can take different forms. In some cases the formalization of the domain into the language of category theory is the goal, the idea here being that this would elucidate the important structure and properties of the domain. In other cases the formalization is used to leverage the power of abstraction in order to prove new results or to develop new algorithms about the field.

== List of applied category theorists ==
- Samson Abramsky
- John C. Baez
- Bob Coecke
- Joachim Lambek
- Valeria de Paiva
- Gordon Plotkin
- Dana Scott
- David Spivak

== See also ==
- Categorical quantum mechanics
- ZX-calculus
- DisCoCat
- Petri net
- Univalent foundations
- String diagrams
