= Spekkens =

Spekkens is a surname. Notable people with the surname include:

- Kristine Spekkens (fl. 2000), Canadian astronomer
- Robert Spekkens (fl. 2012), Canadian theoretical quantum physicist
  - Spekkens toy model, quantum physics theory introduced by Robert Spekkens
