= FinVect =

Category of finite-dimension vector spaces

In the mathematical field of category theory, FinVect (or FdVect) is the category whose objects are all finite-dimensional vector spaces and whose morphisms are all linear maps between them.

== Properties ==
FinVect has two monoidal products:

- the direct sum of vector spaces, which is both a categorical product and a coproduct,
- the tensor product, which makes FinVect a compact closed category.

== Examples ==
Tensor networks are string diagrams interpreted in FinVect.

Group representations are functors from groups, seen as one-object categories, into FinVect.

DisCoCat models are monoidal functors from a pregroup grammar to FinVect.

== See also ==
- FinSet
- ZX-calculus
- category of modules
