= KCBS pentagram =

In quantum foundations, the KCBS pentagram is an example disproving noncontextual hidden variable models. It was discovered by Alexander Klyachko, M. Ali Can, Sinem Binicioglu, and Alexander Shumovsky, whose last initials provide its name.

== Example ==
This phenomenon can be shown with a pentagram, which is a graph with 5 vertices and 5 edges. Each vertex can be colored either red or blue. An edge is said to match if both of its vertices have the same color. In a hidden variable model, the total number of mismatches over all of the edges has to be an even number due to cyclicity, i.e. 0, 2 or 4. Therefore, with a probability mixture over hidden variable assignments, the expectation value of the sum of mismatches over all of the 5 edges lies between 0 and 4.

A large number of KCBS pentagrams can be imagined, each with colorings hidden. On each pentagram, a theoretical observer uncovers 2 vertices that share a common edge. Doing this shows that no matter which edge is chosen, it always ends with finding blue-blue with a probability of $1-\frac{2}{\sqrt 5}$, red-blue with $\frac{1}{\sqrt 5}$, and blue-red with $\frac{1}{\sqrt 5}$. So, the expectation value of the sum of mismatches is $2\sqrt 5 \approx 4.47 > 4$.

To explain, each pentagram is a 3D quantum system with an orthonormal basis $\left\{ |A\rangle, |B \rangle, |C\rangle \right\}$, and is initialized to $|C\rangle$. Each vertex is assigned a 1D projector projecting to $\frac{1}{\sqrt{\sqrt{5}}}|C\rangle + \sqrt{1-\frac{1}{\sqrt{5}}} \left[ \cos\left( \frac{4\pi n}{5}\right)|A\rangle + \sin\left( \frac{4\pi n}{5} \right)|B\rangle \right]$, n = 0, ..., 4 .

Adjacent projectors commute. Projected vertices are colored red; otherwise, blue.

== See also ==
- Mermin–Peres square
