= Quantum natural language processing =

Quantum computing applied to natural language processing

Quantum natural language processing (QNLP) is the application of quantum computing to natural language processing (NLP). It computes word embeddings as parameterised quantum circuits that can solve NLP tasks faster than any classical computer. It is inspired by categorical quantum mechanics and the DisCoCat framework, making use of string diagrams to translate from grammatical structure to quantum processes.

== Theory ==
The first quantum algorithm for natural language processing used the DisCoCat framework and Grover's algorithm to show a quadratic quantum speedup for a text classification task. It was later shown that quantum language processing is BQP-Complete, i.e. quantum language models are more expressive than their classical counterpart, unless quantum mechanics can be efficiently simulated by classical computers.

These two theoretical results assume fault-tolerant quantum computation and a QRAM, i.e. an efficient way to load classical data on a quantum computer. Thus, they are not applicable to the noisy intermediate-scale quantum (NISQ) computers available today.

== Experiments ==
The algorithm of Zeng and Coecke was adapted to the constraints of NISQ computers and implemented on IBM quantum computers to solve binary classification tasks. Instead of loading classical word vectors onto a quantum memory, the word vectors are computed directly as the parameters of quantum circuits. These parameters are optimised using methods from quantum machine learning to solve data-driven tasks such as question answering, machine translation and even algorithmic music composition.

== See also ==
- Categorical quantum mechanics
- Natural language processing
- Quantum machine learning
- Applied category theory
- String diagram
