= David Spivak =

American mathematician

David Isaac Spivak
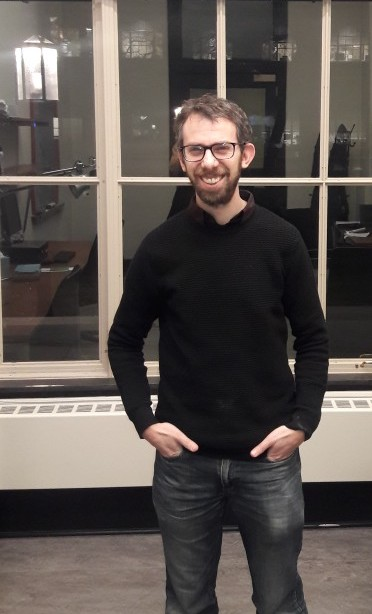
- Spivak in December 2019
- Born: Los Angeles, California
- Education: University of Maryland; University of California Berkeley
- Known for: Ologs
- Scientific career
- Fields: Mathematics; Category theory Applied category theory
- Workplaces: Topos Institute

David Isaac Spivak is an American mathematician and senior scientist at the Topos Institute. He has worked on applications of category theory, in particular ologs and operadic compositionality of dynamical systems. He authored and coauthored the introductory texts on category theory and its applications, Category Theory for the Sciences and An Invitation to Applied Category Theory.

== Early life and education ==
Spivak received his PhD in mathematics from UC Berkeley in 2007 under the supervision of Peter Teichner and Jacob Lurie. His thesis was on derived manifolds, Spivak worked as a postdoc at the University of Oregon and Massachusetts Institute of Technology.

== Work ==
Spivak and Robert Kent developed a human-readable categorical system of knowledge representation called ologs. These were applied, in a series of collaborations with the materials scientist Markus Buehler, to different problems in materials science. Ologs have been also used by researchers at NIST. The goal of ologs, and of Spivak's book Category Theory for the Sciences, was to show that category theory can be made relatively easy and thus be understood by a wider audience. Piet Hut endorsed the book saying, "This is the first, and so far the only, book to make category theory accessible to non-mathematicians."

Spivak has also studied dynamical systems and operads, originating the operadic approach to wiring diagram syntax. His unpublished work "Metric realization of fuzzy simplicial sets" was cited by the authors of UMAP as inspirational for that work.

Spivak and Brendan Fong wrote a book that summarizes the developments in applied category theory for a wide audience, and started a nonprofit applied category theory research institute called Topos Institute, located in Berkeley, California. The two, together with Rémy Tuyeras, wrote the first article using category theory to understand the structure of deep learning, called "Backprop as functor".

Spivak is an editor of a diamond open access journal, Compositionality.

== Bibliography ==
- Spivak. Category Theory for the Sciences, MIT Press, 2014
- Schultz & Spivak. Temporal Type Theory: a Topos-Theoretic Approach to Systems and Behavior, Springer-Verlag, 2019, doi:10.1007/978-3-030-00704-1
- Fong & Spivak. An Invitation to Applied Category Theory: Seven Sketches in Compositionality, Cambridge University Press, 2019, doi:10.1017/9781108668804
