= S-knot =

Equivalence class of spin networks

In loop quantum gravity, an s-knot is an equivalence class of spin networks under diffeomorphisms. In this formalism, s-knots represent the quantum states of the gravitational field.
