= Spin network =

Diagram used to represent quantum field theory calculations

Spin network diagram, after Penrose

In physics, a spin network is a type of diagram which can be used to represent states and interactions between particles and fields in quantum mechanics. From a mathematical perspective, the diagrams are a concise way to represent multilinear functions and functions between representations of matrix groups. The diagrammatic notation can thus greatly simplify calculations.

Roger Penrose described spin networks in 1971. Spin networks have since been applied to the theory of quantum gravity by Carlo Rovelli, Lee Smolin, Jorge Pullin, Rodolfo Gambini and others.

Spin networks can also be used to construct a particular functional on the space of connections which is invariant under local gauge transformations.

== Definition ==
=== Penrose's definition ===
A spin network, as described in Penrose (1971), is a kind of diagram in which each line segment represents the world line of a "unit" (either an elementary particle or a compound system of particles). Three line segments join at each vertex. A vertex may be interpreted as an event in which either a single unit splits into two or two units collide and join into a single unit. Diagrams whose line segments are all joined at vertices are called closed spin networks. Time may be viewed as going in one direction, such as from the bottom to the top of the diagram, but for closed spin networks the direction of time is irrelevant to calculations.

Each line segment is labelled with an integer called a spin number. A unit with spin number n is called an n-unit and has angular momentum nħ/2, where ħ is the reduced Planck constant. For bosons, such as photons and gluons, n is an even number. For fermions, such as electrons and quarks, n is odd.

Given any closed spin network, a non-negative integer can be calculated which is called the norm of the spin network. Norms can be used to calculate the probabilities of various spin values. A network whose norm is zero has zero probability of occurrence. The rules for calculating norms and probabilities are beyond the scope of this article. However, they imply that for a spin network to have nonzero norm, two requirements must be met at each vertex. Suppose a vertex joins three units with spin numbers a, b, and c. Then, these requirements are stated as:

- Triangle inequality: a ≤ b + c and b ≤ a + c and c ≤ a + b.
- Fermion conservation: a + b + c must be an even number.

For example, a = 3, b = 4, c = 6 is impossible since 3 + 4 + 6 = 13 is odd, and a = 3, b = 4, c = 9 is impossible since 9 > 3 + 4. However, a = 3, b = 4, c = 5 is possible since 3 + 4 + 5 = 12 is even, and the triangle inequality is satisfied. Some conventions use labellings by half-integers, with the condition that the sum a + b + c must be a whole number.

=== Formal approach to definition ===
Formally, a spin network may be defined as a (directed) graph whose edges are associated with irreducible representations of a compact Lie group and whose vertices are associated with intertwiners of the edge representations adjacent to it.

=== Properties ===
A spin network, immersed into a manifold, can be used to define a functional on the space of connections on this manifold. One computes holonomies of the connection along every link (closed path) of the graph, determines representation matrices corresponding to every link, multiplies all matrices and intertwiners together, and contracts indices in a prescribed way. A remarkable feature of the resulting functional is that it is invariant under local gauge transformations.

== Usage in physics ==
=== In the context of loop quantum gravity ===
In loop quantum gravity (LQG), a spin network represents a "quantum state" of the gravitational field on a 3-dimensional hypersurface. The set of all possible spin networks (or, more accurately, "s-knots" – that is, equivalence classes of spin networks under diffeomorphisms) is countable; it constitutes a basis of LQG Hilbert space.

One of the key results of loop quantum gravity is quantization of areas: the operator of the area A of a two-dimensional surface Σ should have a discrete spectrum. Every spin network is an eigenstate of each such operator, and the area eigenvalue equals

$$A_{\Sigma} = 8\pi \ell_\text{PL}^2\gamma
\sum_i  \sqrt{j_i(j_i+1)}$$

where the sum goes over all intersections i of Σ with the spin network. In this formula,

- ℓ_{PL} is the Planck length,
- $\gamma$ is the Immirzi parameter and
- j_{i} = 0, 1/2, 1, 3/2, ... is the spin associated with the link i of the spin network. The two-dimensional area is therefore "concentrated" in the intersections with the spin network.

According to this formula, the lowest possible non-zero eigenvalue of the area operator corresponds to a link that carries spin 1/2 representation. Assuming an Immirzi parameter on the order of 1, this gives the smallest possible measurable area of ~10^{−66} cm^{2}.

The formula for area eigenvalues becomes somewhat more complicated if the surface is allowed to pass through the vertices, as with anomalous diffusion models. Also, the eigenvalues of the area operator A are constrained by ladder symmetry.

Similar quantization applies to the volume operator. The volume of a 3D submanifold that contains part of a spin network is given by a sum of contributions from each node inside it. One can think that every node in a spin network is an elementary "quantum of volume" and every link is a "quantum of area" surrounding this volume.

=== More general gauge theories ===
Similar constructions can be made for general gauge theories with a compact Lie group G and a connection form. This is actually an exact duality over a lattice. Over a manifold however, assumptions like diffeomorphism invariance are needed to make the duality exact (smearing Wilson loops is tricky). Later, it was generalized by Robert Oeckl to representations of quantum groups in 2 and 3 dimensions using the Tannaka–Krein duality.

Michael A. Levin and Xiao-Gang Wen have also defined string-nets using tensor categories that are objects very similar to spin networks. However the exact connection with spin networks is not clear yet. String-net condensation produces topologically ordered states in condensed matter.

== Usage in mathematics ==
In mathematics, spin networks have been used to study skein modules and character varieties, which correspond to spaces of connections.

== See also ==
- Spin connection
- Spin structure
- Character variety
- Penrose graphical notation
- Spin foam
- String-net
- Trace diagram
- Tensor network
