= Mehrnoosh Sadrzadeh =

- Born: Iran
- Education: Université du Québec à Montréal; Sharif University of Technology
- Scientific career
- Workplaces: Queen Mary University of London; University College London
- Thesis: Actions and resources in epistemic logic. (2007)
- Doctoral advisor: Mathieu Marion; Alexandru Baltag

Mehrnoosh Sadrzadeh is an Iranian British academic who is a professor at University College London. She was awarded a senior research fellowship at the Royal Academy of Engineering in 2022.

== Early life and education ==
Sadrzadeh is from Iran. She received her undergraduate and master's degrees at Sharif University of Technology. After earning her master's degree Sadrzadeh moved to Canada. She was a doctoral researcher first at the University of Ottawa, where she was awarded an Ontario Graduate Scholarship, a University of Ottawa Excellence Scholarship, and a Canada Female Doctoral Student Award, and then at the Université du Québec à Montréal. Her research considered epistemic logic. Alongside earning her doctorate, Sadrzadeh moved to the University of Oxford as an EPSRC postdoctoral fellow.

== Research and career ==
In 2011, Sadrzadeh was awarded an Engineering and Physical Sciences Research Council Career Acceleration Fellowship. She was appointed to the faculty at Queen Mary University of London, where she combined statistical and logical methods to study how language works.

Whilst machine learning can improve reasoning about textual data, systems making use of machine learning cannot be translated to all applications. Sadrzadeh develops tensor-based mathematical models to improve these processes by combining logic, statistics and machine learning to strengthen the information from textual data. These models are based on the DisCoCat framework that she introduced with Bob Coecke and Stephen Clark. She was awarded two industrial fellowships from the Royal Academy of Engineering, which allowed her to build partnerships with the BBC. In particular she concentrated on the development of tensorial analysis for textual understanding of subtitles and news. At the time it was estimated that the average adult spends about one and a half years of their lives trying to device what to watch on broadcasting platforms. Sadrzadeh looks to improve the quality and accuracy of recommendation algorithms.

Sadrzadeh is involved in the conference SemSpace (Semantic Spaces at the Intersection of NLP, Physics, and Cognitive Science). In 2020, Sadrzadeh gave a talk "Gaussianity and typicality in matrix distributional semantics" and in 2021 she was co-organiser. In 2022, Sadrzadeh was awarded a Royal Academy of Engineering Senior Fellowship.

== Selected publications ==
- Coecke, Bob; Sadrzadeh, Mehrnoosh; Clark, Stephen (2010-03-23). Mathematical Foundations for a Compositional Distributional Model of Meaning. OCLC 691099628.
- Grefenstette, Edward; Sadrzadeh, Mehrnoosh (March 2015). "Concrete Models and Empirical Evaluations for the Categorical Compositional Distributional Model of Meaning". Computational Linguistics. 41 (1): 71–118. doi:10.1162/coli_a_00209. ISSN 0891-2017. S2CID 17075447.
- Marco, Grefenstette, Edward Dinu, Georgiana Zhang, Yao-Zhong Sadrzadeh, Mehrnoosh Baroni (2013-01-29). Multi-Step Regression Learning for Compositional Distributional Semantics. OCLC 1106182000.
