= Robert Spekkens =

Canadian theoretical quantum physicist

- Citizenship: Canadian
- Education: McGill University, University of Toronto
- Known for: Spekkens toy model; quantum contextuality
- Awards: Birkhoff-von Neumann Prize of the International Quantum Structures Association (2008); FQXI Essay contest "Questioning the Foundations: Which of Our Assumptions Are Wrong?" (2012)
- Scientific career
- Fields: Physicist
- Workplaces: Perimeter Institute for Theoretical Physics; University of Cambridge; University of Waterloo; Griffith University

Robert W. Spekkens is a Canadian theoretical quantum physicist working in the fields of quantum foundations and quantum information.

He is known for his work on epistemic view of quantum states (in particular the Spekkens toy model), quantum contextuality, quantum resource theories and quantum causality.

He co-edited the book Quantum Theory: Informational Foundations and Foils.

== Career ==
Spekkens is a faculty member and the leader of the quantum causal inference initiative at Perimeter Institute for Theoretical Physics. He regularly teaches the course on quantum foundations in the Perimeter Scholars International master's program.

He is an adjunct faculty in the Department of Physics of the University of Waterloo and an adjunct research fellow in the Centre for Quantum Dynamics of Griffith University in Brisbane, Australia.

== Awards ==
- 2012 FQXI Essay contest "Questioning the Foundations: Which of Our Assumptions Are Wrong?"
