= Classical information channel =

Type of communication channel in quantum information science

In quantum information science, a classical information channel (often called simply classical channel) is a communication channel that can be used to transmit classical information (as opposed to quantum channel which can transmit quantum information). An example would be a light travelling over fiber optics lines or electricity travelling over phone lines.

Although classical channels cannot transmit quantum information by themselves, they can be useful in combination with quantum channels. Examples of their use are:

- In quantum teleportation, a classical channel together with a previously prepared entangled quantum state are used to transmit quantum information between two parties. Neither the classical channel nor the previously prepared quantum state alone can do this task.
- In quantum cryptography, a classical channel is used along with a quantum channel in protocols for quantum key exchange.
- In quantum communication, the information rate of a noisy quantum channel can be increased when used together with a noise-free classical channel. In particular, some very noisy quantum channels cannot transmit quantum information if used alone but can transmit it if used together with a classical channel (which is not capable of transmitting quantum information by itself).

== See also ==
- Quantum channel
