= Spekkens toy model =

Epistemic model

The Spekkens toy model is a conceptually simple toy hidden-variable theory introduced by Robert Spekkens in 2004, to argue in favour of the epistemic view of quantum mechanics. The model is based on a foundational principle: "If one has maximal knowledge, then for every system, at every time, the amount of knowledge one possesses about the ontic state of the system at that time must equal the amount of knowledge one lacks." This is called the "knowledge balance principle". Within the bounds of this model, many phenomena typically associated with strictly quantum-mechanical effects are present. These include (but are not limited to) entanglement, noncommutativity of measurements, teleportation, interference, the no-cloning and no-broadcasting theorems, and unsharp measurements. The toy model cannot, however, reproduce quantum nonlocality and quantum contextuality, as it is a local and non-contextual hidden-variable theory.

== Background ==
For nearly a century, physicists and philosophers have been attempting to explain the physical meaning of quantum states. The argument is typically one between two fundamentally opposed views: the ontic view, which describes quantum states as states of physical reality, and the epistemic view, which describes quantum states as states of our incomplete knowledge about a system. Both views have had strong support over the years; notably, the ontic view was supported by Heisenberg and Schrödinger, and the epistemic view by Einstein. The majority of 20th-century quantum physics was dominated by the ontic view, and it remains the view generally accepted by physicists today. There is, however, a substantial subset of physicists who take the epistemic view. Both views have issues associated with them, as both contradict physical intuition in many cases, and neither has been conclusively proven to be the superior viewpoint.

The Spekkens toy model is designed to argue in favour of the epistemic viewpoint. It is, by construction, an epistemic model. The knowledge balance principle of the model ensures that any measurement done on a system within it gives incomplete knowledge of the system, and thus the observable states of the system are epistemic. This model also implicitly assumes that there is an ontic state which the system is in at any given time, but simply that we are unable to observe it. The model can not be used to derive quantum mechanics, as there are fundamental differences between the model and quantum theory. In particular, the model is one of local and noncontextual variables, which Bell's theorem tells us cannot ever reproduce all the predictions of quantum mechanics. The toy model does, however, reproduce a number of strange quantum effects and does so from a strictly epistemic perspective; as such, it can be interpreted as strong evidence in favour of the epistemic view.

== The model ==
The Spekkens toy model is based on the knowledge balance principle "the number of questions about the physical state of a system that are answered must always be equal to the number that are unanswered in a state of maximal knowledge". However, the "knowledge" one can possess about a system must be carefully defined for this principle to have any meaning. To do this, the concept of a canonical set of yes-or-no questions is defined as the minimal number of questions needed. For example, for a system with 4 states, one can ask: "Is the system in state 1?", "Is the system in state 2?" and "Is the system in state 3?", which would determine the state of the system (state 4 being the case if all three questions were answered "No."). However, one could also ask: "Is the system in either state 1 or state 2?" and "Is the system in either state 1 or state 3?", which would also uniquely determine the state and has only two questions in the set. This set of questions is not unique, however, it is clear that at least two questions (bits) are required to exactly represent one of four states. We say that for a system with 4 states, the number of questions in a canonical set is two. As such, in this case, the knowledge balance principle insists that the maximal number of questions in a canonical set that one can have answered at any given time is one, such that the amount of knowledge is equal to the amount of ignorance.

It is also assumed in the model that it is always possible to saturate the inequality, i.e. to have knowledge of the system exactly equal to that which is lacked, and thus at least two questions must be in the canonical set. Since no question is allowed to exactly specify the state of the system, the number of possible ontic states must be at least 4 (if it were less than 4, the model would be trivial, since any question that could be asked may return an answer specifying the exact state of the system, thus no question can be asked). Since a system with four states (described above) exists, it is referred to as an elementary system. The model then also assumes that every system is built out of these elementary systems, and that each subsystem of any system also obeys the knowledge balance principle.

== Elementary systems ==
For an elementary system, let 1 ∨ 2 represent the state of knowledge "the system is in state 1 or state 2". Under this model, there are 6 states of maximal knowledge that can be obtained: 1 ∨ 2, 1 ∨ 3, 1 ∨ 4, 2 ∨ 3, 2 ∨ 4 and 3 ∨ 4. There is also a single state less than maximal knowledge, corresponding to 1 ∨ 2 ∨ 3 ∨ 4. These can be mapped to 6 qubit states in a natural manner:

$$1 \lor 2 \iff | 0 \rangle,$$
$$3 \lor 4 \iff | 1 \rangle,$$
$$1 \lor 3 \iff | + \rangle,$$
$$2 \lor 4 \iff | - \rangle,$$
$$1 \lor 4 \iff | i \rangle,$$
$$2 \lor 3 \iff | -i \rangle,$$
$$1 \lor 2 \lor 3 \lor 4 \iff I/2.$$

Under this mapping, it is clear that two states of knowledge in the toy theory correspond to two orthogonal states for the qubit if and only if they share no ontic states in common. This mapping also gives analogues in the toy model to quantum fidelity, compatibility, convex combinations of states and coherent superposition, and can be mapped to the Bloch sphere in the natural fashion. However, the analogy breaks down to a degree when considering coherent superposition, as one of the forms of the coherent superposition in the toy model returns a state that is orthogonal to what is expected with the corresponding superposition in the quantum model, and this can be shown to be an intrinsic difference between the two systems. This reinforces the earlier point that this model is not a restricted version of quantum mechanics, but instead a separate model that mimics quantum properties.

=== Transformations ===
The only transformations on the ontic state of the system that respect the knowledge balance principle are permutations of the 4 ontic states. These map valid epistemic states to other valid epistemic states, for instance (using cycle notation to represent permutations):

$$((12)(34)) (1 \lor 2) \to 1 \lor 2,$$
$$((12)(34)) (1 \lor 3) \to 2 \lor 4,$$
$$((12)(3)(4)) (1 \lor 3) \to 2 \lor 3.$$

Considering again the analogy between the epistemic states of this model and the qubit states on the Bloch sphere, these transformations consist of the typical allowed permutations of the 6 analogous states, as well as a set of permutations that are forbidden in the continuous qubit model. These are transformations such as (12)(3)(4), which correspond to antiunitary maps on Hilbert space. These are not allowed in a continuous model, however in this discrete system they arise as natural transformations. There is, however, an analogy to a characteristically quantum phenomenon, that no allowed transformation functions as a universal state inverter. In this case, this means that there is no single transformation S with the properties

$$S(1 \lor 2) \to 3 \lor 4, \qquad S(3 \lor 4) \to 1 \lor 2,$$
$$S(1 \lor 3) \to 2 \lor 4, \qquad S(2 \lor 4) \to 1 \lor 3,$$
$$S(1 \lor 4) \to 2 \lor 3, \qquad S(2 \lor 3) \to 1 \lor 4.$$

=== Measurements ===
In the theory, only reproducible measurements (measurements that cause the system after the measurement to be consistent with the results of the measurement) are considered. As such, only measurements that distinguish between valid epistemic states are allowed. For instance, we could measure whether the system is in states 1 or 2, 1 or 3, or 1 or 4, corresponding to 1 ∨ 2, 1 ∨ 3, and 1 ∨ 4. Once the measurement has been done, one's state of knowledge about the system in question is updated; specifically, if one measured the system in the state 2 ∨ 4, then the system would now be known to be in the ontic state 2 or the ontic state 4.

Before a measurement is done on a system, it has a definite ontic state, in the case of an elementary system 1, 2, 3 or 4. If the initial ontic state of a system is 1, and one measured the state of the system with respect to the {1 ∨ 3, 2 ∨ 4} basis, then one would measure the state 1 ∨ 3. Another measurement done in this basis would produce the same result. However, the underlying ontic state of the system can be changed by such a measurement, to either the state 1 or the state 3. This reflects the nature of measurement in quantum theory.

Measurements done on a system in the toy model are non-commutative, as is the case for quantum measurements. This is due to the above fact, that a measurement can change the underlying ontic state of the system. For example, if one measures a system in the state 1 ∨ 3 in the {1 ∨ 3, 2 ∨ 4} basis, then one obtains the state 1 ∨ 3 with certainty. However, if one first measures the system in the {1 ∨ 2, 3 ∨ 4} basis, then in the {1 ∨ 3, 2 ∨ 4} basis, then the final state of the system is uncertain, prior to the measurement.

The nature of measurements and of the coherent superposition in this theory also gives rise to the quantum phenomenon of interference. When two states are mixed by a coherent superposition, the result is a sampling of the ontic states from both, rather than the typical "and" or "or". This is one of the most important results of this model, as interference is often seen as evidence against the epistemic view. This model indicates that it can arise from a strictly epistemic system.

== Groups of elementary systems ==
A pair of elementary systems has 16 combined ontic states, corresponding to the combinations of the numbers 1 through 4 with 1 through 4 (i.e. the system can be in the state (1,1), (1,2), etc.). The epistemic state of the system is limited by the knowledge balance principle once again. Now however, not only does it restrict the knowledge of the system as a whole, but also of both of the constituent subsystems. Two types of systems of maximal knowledge arise as a result. The first of these corresponds to having maximal knowledge of both subsystems; for example, that the first subsystem is in the state 1 ∨ 3 and the second is in the state 3 ∨ 4, meaning that the system as a whole is in one of the states (1,3), (1,4), (3,3) or (3,4). In this case, nothing is known about the correspondence between the two systems. The second is more interesting, corresponding to having no knowledge about either system individually, but having maximal knowledge about their interaction. For example, one could know that the ontic state of the system is one of (1,1), (2,2), (3,4) or (4,3). Here nothing is known about the state of either individual system, but knowledge of one system gives knowledge of the other. This corresponds to the entangling of particles in quantum theory.

It is possible to consider valid transformations on the states of a group of elementary systems, although the mathematics of such an analysis is more complicated than the case for a single system. Transformations consisting of a valid transformation on each state acting independently are always valid. In the case of a two-system model, there is also a transformation that is analogous to the c-not operator on qubits. Furthermore, within the bounds of the model it is possible to prove no-cloning and no-broadcasting theorems, reproducing a fair deal of the mechanics of quantum information theory.

The monogamy of pure entanglement also has a strong analogue within the toy model, as a group of three or more systems in which knowledge of one system would grant knowledge of the others would break the knowledge balance principle. An analogy of quantum teleportation also exists in the model, as well as a number of important quantum phenomena.

== Extensions and further work ==
The toy model with its extensions to both continuous phase space and higher dimensional discrete phase space are coined as "epistricted theories" in Ref.

Work has been done on several models of physical systems with similar characteristics, which are described in detail in the main publication on this model. There are ongoing attempts to extend this model in various ways, such as van Enk's model and a continuous-variable version based on Liouville mechanics. The toy model has also been analyzed from the viewpoint of categorical quantum mechanics.

Currently, there is work being done to reproduce quantum formalism from information-theoretic axioms. Although the model itself differs in many respects from quantum theory, it reproduces a number of effects considered to be overwhelmingly quantum. As such, the underlying principle, that quantum states are states of incomplete knowledge, may offer some hints as to how to proceed in this manner and may lend hope to those pursuing this goal.

== See also ==
- Hidden variable theory
- Interpretation of quantum mechanics
