= Lattice surgery =

In quantum computing, lattice surgery is a method for executing logical gates between two error-corrected qubits. Lattice surgery introduces the concepts of "merging" and "splitting" logical qubits. Managed properly, these operations can execute a logical CNOT gate between two logical qubits. Originally defined for surface code quantum error correction, the technique was later extended to other codes such as quantum low density parity check (QLDPC) codes.

Certain approaches to fault-tolerant quantum computing rely on surface codes which encode a single logical qubit in many physical qubits. However, every surface code is only designed to encode a single qubit. In order to actually do computation, these individual qubits must be able to talk to one another, and that is the purpose of lattice surgery.

== Background ==
=== Quantum error correction ===
The dominant method for quantum error correction are topological codes such as color codes and surface codes. These codes use many physical qubits to implement a single logical qubit. Such arrays of physical qubits are the lattices of lattice surgery. However, such codes only encode a single qubit.

== Demonstrations ==
Lattice surgery has been experimentally demonstrated in trapped ions, superconducting qubits, and neutral atoms.
