= Juani Bermejo Vega =

Spanish quantum computing researcher, and activist (born 1987)

- Born: 1987 (age 38–39); Cáceres, Spain
- Education: Technical University of Munich (Ph.D) (2016), University of Salamanca (Bachelor's degree) (2011)
- Occupations: Professor, physicist, systems engineer and transgender rights activist
- Scientific career
- Workplaces: University of Granada, Free University of Berlin
- Thesis: Normalizer Circuits and Quantum Computation (2016)
- Doctoral advisor: Ignacio Cirac, Maarten Van den Nest

Juani Bermejo Vega (born 1987 in Cáceres, Spain) is a Spanish quantum computing researcher, activist, and the most senior transgender woman in quantum computing in Europe.

== Career ==
Bermejo completed a double degree in computer science and physics at the University of Salamanca. Her scientific vocation was partly inspired by her aunt, a professor of systems and automation engineering at the same university. After studying for a year in Canada in 2008, she decided to pursue research in quantum computing. She completed her doctoral work in Munich under the supervision of physicist Juan Ignacio Cirac.

During her doctorate, she completed a research stay at the Massachusetts Institute of Technology (MIT) in Boston. After earning her Ph.D., she spent three years as a researcher at the Free University of Berlin. In 2019, she returned to Spain with a research position at the University of Granada. She is one of the few transgender scientists worldwide at her level in quantum computing, the most senior in this field in Europe, and Europe's only transgender professor in quantum computing.

She began her transition process in 2018 and came out in 2019 while in Berlin. Transitioning has led to a loss of authority in her field, which has led her to reflect that if she had started her transition earlier, her scientific career might have been negatively impacted due to prejudice.

As a science communicator and LGBTQ activist, she is co-founder of the Q-Turn project, a quantum computing conference that prioritizes diversity among speakers. These inclusive conferences highlight women and minority groups in a relaxed and welcoming environment. Additionally, Bermejo was a founding member of the Equal Opportunities Working Group of Max Planck PhDnet in 2014.

== Recognition ==
- Athenea3i-Marie (Sklodowska) Curie Research Fellowship.
- Named among the 20 Granada residents to follow in 2020 by the digital media outlet Ideal.
