= Information flow =

Tracking of referential information by speakers

In discourse-based grammatical theory, information flow is any tracking of referential information by speakers. Information may be new, i.e., just introduced into the conversation; given, i.e., already active in the speakers' consciousness; or old, i.e., no longer active. The various types of activation, and how these are defined, are model-dependent.

Information flow affects grammatical structures such as:

- Word order (topic, focus, and afterthought constructions).
- Active, passive, or middle voice.
- Choice of deixis, such as articles; "medial" deictics such as Spanish ese and Japanese sore are generally determined by the familiarity of a referent rather than by physical distance.
- Overtness of information, such as whether an argument of a verb is indicated by a lexical noun phrase, a pronoun, or not mentioned at all.
- Clefting: Splitting a single clause into two clauses, each with its own verb, e.g. ‘The chicken turtles tasted like chicken.’ becomes ‘It was the chicken turtle | that tasted like chicken.’ In this case, clefting is used to shift the focus of the sentence to the subject, the chicken turtle.
- Front focus: Placing at the start (front) of a sentence information that would normally occur later in the sentence, to give it extra prominence. For example, in pop culture, Yoda's speech often utilizes such syntactic construction, such as when he says 'much to learn you still have' to Luke Skywalker.
- End focus (or end weight): Given or familiar information followed by new information. This gives prominence to the final part of the sentences and can enable suspense to build, e.g. ‘Through the door came a gigantic wolf’.(Umer Prince)
