= Samson Abramsky =

British computer scientist

Samson Abramsky FRS FRSE
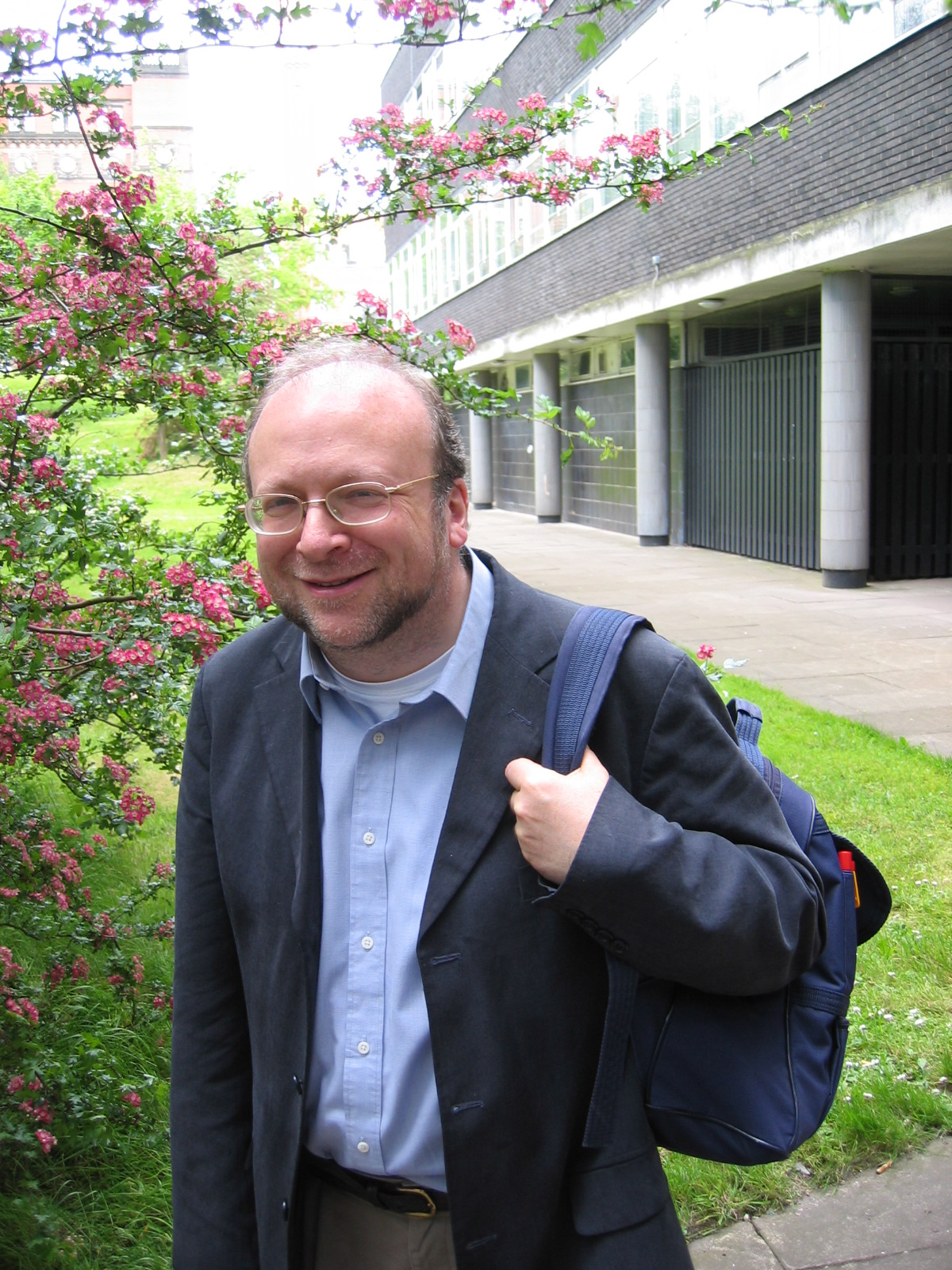
- Abramsky in May 2005
- Born: 12 March 1953 (age 73)
- Education: King's College, Cambridge (BA, MA, Dipl.); Queen Mary University of London (PhD)
- Awards: FRS; FRSE; Lovelace Medal (2013); ACM Fellow (2014)
- Scientific career
- Fields: Theoretical computer science; Quantum information and foundations; Game semantics; Category Theory
- Workplaces: University of Oxford; University of Edinburgh; University of Cambridge; Imperial College London; General Electric Company plc
- Thesis: Domain Theory and the Logic of Observable Properties (1987)
- Doctoral advisor: Richard Bornat
- Website: www.cs.ox.ac.uk/samson.abramsky

Samson Abramsky (born 12 March 1953) is a British computer scientist who is a Professor of Computer Science at University College London. He was previously the Christopher Strachey Professor of Computing at Wolfson College, Oxford, from 2000 to 2021.

Abramsky's early work included contributions to domain theory and the connections thereof with geometric logic. Since then, his work has covered the lazy lambda calculus, strictness analysis, concurrency theory, interaction categories and geometry of interaction, game semantics and quantum computing. Notably, he co-pioneered categorical quantum mechanics. More recently, he has been applying methods from categorical semantics to finite model theory, with applications to descriptive complexity.

== Education ==
Abramsky was educated at Hasmonean Grammar School for Boys, Hendon and at King's College, Cambridge (BA 1975, MA Philosophy 1979, Diploma in Computer Science) and Queen Mary, University of London (PhD Computer Science 1988, supervised by Richard Bornat).

== Career and research ==
Since 2021, Abramsky has been Professor of Computer Science at University College London. He has been a Fellow of the Royal Society since 2004. His research includes the development of game semantics, domain theory in logical form, and categorical quantum mechanics.

His earlier positions include:

- Programmer, GEC Computers Limited, 1976–1978
- Lecturer, Department of Computer Science and Statistics, QMUL, 1980–1983
- Lecturer, 1983–1988, reader, 1988–1990, professor, 1990–1995, Department of Computing, Imperial College London
- Professor of Theoretical Computer Science, University of Edinburgh, 1996–2000
- Christopher Strachey Professor of Computing, University of Oxford, 2000–2021

Abramsky has played a leading role in the development of game semantics, and its applications to the semantics of programming languages. Other notable contributions include his work on domain theory in logical form, the lazy lambda calculus, strictness analysis, concurrency theory, interaction categories, and geometry of interaction. He has recently been working on high-level methods for quantum computation and information.

=== Selected publications ===
Samson Abramsky co-edited 6 Volumes Handbook of Logic in Computer Science with Dov Gabbay and Tom Maibaum:

- 1992. Volume 1: Background: Mathematical Structures.
- 1992. Volume 2: Background: Computational Structures.
- 1995. Volume 3: Semantic Structures.
- 1995. Volume 4: Semantic Modelling.
- 2001. Volume 5: Logic and Algebraic Methods.
- Volume 6: Logical methods in computer science.

Abramsky has published over two hundred publications and his h-index was 57 as of October 2019.

- 1986. Strictness analysis for higher-order functions. (with GL Burn, C Hankin). Science of Computer Programming.
- 1990. The Lazy Lambda Calculus. Research Topics in Functional Programming.
- 1993. Computational Interpretations of Linear logic. in Theoretical Computer Science 111
- 1994. Domain Theory. (with A Jung). in Handbook of Logic in Computer Science 3.
- 1996. Interaction categories and the foundations of typed concurrent programming. (with S Gay and R Nagarajan). NATO ASI SERIES F COMPUTER AND SYSTEMS SCIENCES 152
- 1997. Specifying interaction categories. (with D Pavlović). Category Theory and Computer Science
- 2002. Geometry of interaction and linear combinatory algebras. (with E Haghverdi and P Scott). Mathematical Structures in Computer Science 12 (5)
- 2003. Sequentiality vs. concurrency in games and logic. Mathematical Structures in Computer Science 13 (4)

Some of the later works of Abramsky include:

- 2010. Introduction to categories and categorical logic. (with N. Tzevelekos). In New Structures for Physics. Springer.
- 2012. Logical Bell Inequalities. (with Lucien Hardy). In Physical Review A. Vol. 85. No. ARTN 062114.
- 2013. Robust Constraint Satisfaction and Local Hidden Variables in Quantum Mechanics. (with G. Gottlob and P. Kolaitis). IJCAI.

== Awards and honours ==
Abramsky is a Fellow of the Royal Society (2004), a Fellow of the Royal Society of Edinburgh (2000), and a Member of Academia Europaea (1993). He is a member of the editorial boards of the North Holland Studies in Logic and the Foundations of Mathematics, and of the Cambridge Tracts in Theoretical Computer Science. He was general chair of LiCS 2000–2003, and is a member of the LiCS Organizing Committee.

- He was awarded the EATCS Award in 2024 which is given for contributions to theoretical computer science over a life long career. Among his work mentioned in the laudation are his contributions to domain theory, game semantics, and categorical approach to quantum computation and information.
- He was elected Fellow of ACM (2014) For contributions to domains in logical form, game semantics, categorical quantum mechanics, and contextual semantics.
- He was awarded the BCS Lovelace Medal in 2013
- Three of his papers won the LiCS Test-of-Time award (a 20-year retrospective):
  - Samson Abramsky. "Domain theory in Logical Form" (1987). The award was presented at LiCS 2007.
  - Samson Abramsky, Kohei Honda and Guy McCusker. "A Fully Abstract Game Semantics for General References" (1998). The award was presented at LiCS 2018.
  - Samson Abramsky and Bob Coecke. "A categorical semantics of quantum protocols." (2004). The award was presented at LiCS 2024.
- He was awarded an EPSRC Senior Research Fellowship on Foundational Structures and Methods for Quantum Informatics in 2007.
- Fellow of the Royal Society (2004)
- Fellow of the Royal Society of Edinburgh (2000)

Abramsky's nomination for the Royal Society reads:

Samson Abramsky is distinguished for seminal contributions to the mathematical foundations of computation. His outstanding achievement is his development of Game Semantics as a theory of computational processes which exposes the mathematical structure of the information flow between them. This has led to powerful applications in the study of programming languages, offering decisive new insights into the nature of sequentiality, state, control, and many other computational features. It is now leading in turn to new developments in computer-assisted program analysis and verification. An important strand, which also stands as a contribution to logic, is a generalisation of Girard's Geometry of Interaction, leading to a new genre of full completeness theorems, which characterise the 'space of proofs' of a logic. Previously, Abramsky made important contributions to abstract interpretation, domain theory, lambda calculus and concurrency. He continues to shed light over a broad range of topics by sharp and creative insights, breaking new ground, and bringing order and unity to existing work.
