= Adhesive category =

In mathematics, an adhesive category is a category where pushouts of monomorphisms exist and work more or less as they do in the category of sets. An example of an adhesive category is the category of directed multigraphs, or quivers, and the theory of adhesive categories is important in the theory of graph rewriting.

More precisely, an adhesive category is one where any of the following equivalent conditions hold:

- C has all pullbacks, it has pushouts along monomorphisms, and pushout squares of monomorphisms are also pullback squares and are stable under pullback.
- C has all pullbacks, it has pushouts along monomorphisms, and the latter are also (bicategorical) pushouts in the bicategory of spans in C.

If C is small, we may equivalently say that C has all pullbacks, has pushouts along monomorphisms, and admits a full embedding into a Grothendieck topos preserving pullbacks and preserving pushouts of monomorphisms.
