= Pulation square =

In category theory, a branch of mathematics, a pulation square (also called a Doolittle diagram) is a diagram that is simultaneously a pullback square and a pushout square. It is a self-dual concept.
