= DPO =

DPO may refer to:

== Economics ==
- Data protection officer, under European corporate regulation
- Days payables outstanding, in finance
- Detrended price oscillator, indicator in financial technical analysis
- Direct public offering, method by which a business can offer an investment opportunity to the public

== Entertainment ==
- "D.P.O." (The X-Files), 1995 television episode
- Dayton Philharmonic Orchestra
- Dublin Philharmonic Orchestra

== Science and technology ==
- Digital Phosphor Oscilloscope, a type of electronic test instrument
- Direct preference optimization, a technique for aligning AI models with human preferences
- Double pushout graph rewriting, in computer science

== Other ==
- Dame of the Pontifical Order of Pius IX, rank of the honorific order
- Democratic Party of Oregon
- United Nations Department of Peace Operations, overseeing UN peacekeeping operations
- Devonport Airport, IATA code
- Discontinued post office
- Diplomatic Post Office, system providing postal services to diplomatic missions of the United States
- Digital Policy Office, Hong Kong government agency
