= Fondex Global =

Cypriot online brokerage

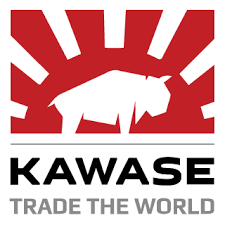
- Type: Private
- Industry: Financial services
- Founded: 2010
- Headquarters: Cyprus
- Key people: Alex Katsaros (CEO)
- Services: Trading, Trading platform, Online contracts for difference (CFDs), Trading on Shares, indices, Forex, Energies and precious metals.
- Number of employees: 120+ (2020)
- Website: fondex.com

Fondex Global (previously known as Kawase) is a Cyprus registered online brokerage that provides financial trading in contracts for difference (CFD) on the currency markets, shares, ETFs, major indices and commodities such as precious metals; gold and crude oil.

Fondex provides financial services to both retail and institutional clients. The company is regulated by the Cyprus financial regulator, CySEC under the name TopFX and falls under the European Union's Markets in Financial Instruments Directive (MiFID).

== History ==
The company was founded in Cyprus in 2010 as TopFX. The retail operation started 5 years later branded as Kawase.

The company name was changed to Fondex Global around 2020.

== Products and services ==
Fodex provides clients the cTrader trading platform with which to trade The company's platform, provides ECN traders with greater price depth and Volume-weighted average price (VWAP).

Fondex also provides trading on mobile devices with mobile apps for both iOS and Android. The Fondex Apps offer news, support and account management functions.

Fondex is connected to its own aggregator, which is linked to several banks and stock exchanges to provide liquidity.

== Regulations ==
Fondex Global is regulated by CySEC under the name TopFX with licence number 138/11 and falls under the European Union’s Markets in Financial Instruments Directive MiFID. Through MiFID, the company is registered with the regulators of 25 EU member states, including BaFin in Germany, the Financial Conduct Authority (FCA) in the UK and Banque De France in France.
