= Attributed graph grammar =

In computer science, an attributed graph grammar is a class of graph grammar that associates vertices with a set of attributes and rewrites with functions on attributes. In the algebraic approach to graph grammars, they are usually formulated using the double-pushout approach or the single-pushout approach.

== Implementation ==
AGG, a rule-based visual language that directly expresses attributed graph grammars using the single-pushout approach has been developed at TU Berlin for many years.

== See also ==
- Graph rewriting
- Attribute grammar
