= Graph matching =

Problem of finding similarity between graphs

Graph matching is the problem of finding a similarity between graphs.

Graphs are commonly used to encode structural information in many fields, including computer vision and pattern recognition, and graph matching is an important tool in these areas. In these areas it is commonly assumed that the comparison is between the data graph and the model graph.

The case of exact graph matching is known as the graph isomorphism problem. The problem of exact matching of a graph to a part of another graph is called subgraph isomorphism problem.

Inexact graph matching refers to matching problems when exact matching is impossible, e.g., when the number of vertices in the two graphs are different. In this case it is required to find the best possible match. For example, in image recognition applications, the results of image segmentation in image processing typically produces data graphs with the numbers of vertices much larger than in the model graphs data expected to match against. In the case of attributed graphs, even if the numbers of vertices and edges are the same, the matching still may be only inexact.

Two categories of search methods are the ones based on identification of possible and impossible pairings of vertices between the two graphs and methods that formulate graph matching as an optimization problem. Graph edit distance is one of similarity measures suggested for graph matching. The class of algorithms is called error-tolerant graph matching.

== See also ==
- String matching
- Pattern matching
