= Pullback (category theory) =

Most general completion of a commutative square given two morphisms with same codomain

In category theory, a branch of mathematics, a pullback (also called a fiber product, fibre product, fibered product or Cartesian square) is the limit of a diagram consisting of two morphisms f : X → Z and g : Y → Z with a common codomain. The pullback is written

P = X ×_{f, Z, g} Y.

Usually the morphisms f and g are omitted from the notation, and then the pullback is written

P = X ×_{Z} Y.

The pullback comes equipped with two natural morphisms P → X and P → Y. The pullback of two morphisms f and g need not exist, but if it does, it is essentially uniquely defined by the two morphisms. In many situations, X ×_{Z} Y may intuitively be thought of as consisting of pairs of elements (x, y) with x in X, y in Y, and f(x) = g(y). For the general definition, a universal property is used, which essentially expresses the fact that the pullback is the "most general" way to complete the two given morphisms to a commutative square.

The dual concept of the pullback is the pushout.

== Universal property ==
Explicitly, a pullback of the morphisms $f$ and $g$ consists of an object $P$ and two morphisms $p_1:P\rightarrow X$ and $p_2:P\rightarrow Y$ for which the diagram

commutes. Moreover, the pullback (P, p_{1}, p_{2}) must be universal with respect to this diagram. That is, for any other such triple (Q, q_{1}, q_{2}) where q_{1} : Q → X and q_{2} : Q → Y are morphisms with f q_{1} = g q_{2}, there must exist a unique u : Q → P such that

$$p_1 \circ u=q_1, \qquad p_2\circ u=q_2.$$

This situation is illustrated in the following commutative diagram.

As with all universal constructions, a pullback, if it exists, is unique up to isomorphism. In fact, given two pullbacks (A, a_{1}, a_{2}) and (B, b_{1}, b_{2}) of the same cospan X → Z ← Y, there is a unique isomorphism between A and B respecting the pullback structure.

== Pullback and product ==
The pullback is similar to the product, but not the same. The ordinary binary product is constructed as the limit of a diagram containing only the two objects X and Y, and no arrows between them (a discrete category), thus "forgetting" the morphisms f and g and the object Z from the definition of the pullback. Alternatively, one can also "trivialize" them by specializing Z to be the terminal object, when it exists. f and g are then uniquely determined and thus carry no information, and the pullback of this cospan can be seen to be the product of X and Y.

Conversely, the pullback can be thought of as the ordinary (Cartesian) product, but with additional structure; formally, the pullback is exactly the binary product in the slice category over Z.

== Examples ==
=== Commutative rings ===
The category of commutative rings admits pullbacks.

In the category of commutative rings (with identity), the pullback is called the fibered product. Let A, B, and C be commutative rings (with identity) and α : A → C and β : B → C (identity preserving) ring homomorphisms. Then the pullback of this diagram exists and is given by the subring of the product ring A × B defined by

$$A \times_{C} B = \left\{(a,b) \in A \times B \; \big| \; \alpha(a) = \beta(b) \right\}$$

along with the morphisms

$$\beta' \colon A \times_{C} B \to A, \qquad \alpha'\colon A \times_{C} B \to B$$

given by $\beta'(a, b) = a$ and $\alpha'(a, b) = b$ for all $(a, b) \in A \times_C B$. We then have

$$\alpha \circ \beta' = \beta \circ \alpha'.$$

=== Groups and modules ===
In complete analogy to the example of commutative rings above, one can show that all pullbacks exist in the category of groups and in the category of modules over some fixed ring.

=== Sets ===
In the category of sets, the pullback of functions f : X → Z and g : Y → Z always exists and is given by the set

$$X\times_Z Y = \{(x, y) \in X \times Y \; \big| \; f(x) = g(y)\} = \bigcup_{z \in f(X) \cap g(Y)} f^{-1}[\{z\}] \times g^{-1}[\{z\}] ,$$

together with the restrictions of the projection maps π_{1} and π_{2} to X ×_{Z} Y.

Alternatively one may view the pullback in Set asymmetrically:

$$X\times_Z Y  \cong \coprod_{x\in X} g^{-1}[\{f(x)\}] \cong \coprod_{y\in Y} f^{-1}[\{g(y)\}]$$

where $\coprod$ is the disjoint union of sets (the involved sets are not disjoint on their own unless f resp. g is injective). In the first case, the projection π_{1} extracts the x index while π_{2} forgets the index, leaving elements of Y.

This example motivates another way of characterizing the pullback: as the equalizer of the morphisms f ∘ p_{1}, g ∘ p_{2} : X × Y → Z where X × Y is the binary product of X and Y and p_{1} and p_{2} are the natural projections. This shows that pullbacks exist in any category with binary products and equalizers. In fact, by the existence theorem for limits, all finite limits exist in a category with binary products and equalizers; equivalently, all finite limits exist in a category with terminal object and pullbacks (by the fact that a binary product is equal to a pullback on the terminal object, and that an equalizer is a pullback involving a binary product).

==== Graphs of functions ====
A specific example of a pullback is given by the graph of a function. Suppose that $f \colon X \to Y$ is a function. The graph of f is the set
$$\Gamma_f = \{(x, f(x)) \colon x \in X\} \subseteq X \times Y.$$
The graph can be reformulated as the pullback of f and the identity function on Y. By definition, this pullback is
$$X \times_{f,Y,1_Y} Y = \{(x, y) \colon f(x) = 1_Y(y)\} = \{(x, y) \colon f(x) = y\} \subseteq X \times Y,$$
and this equals $\Gamma_f$.

=== Fiber bundles ===
Another example of a pullback comes from the theory of fiber bundles: given a bundle map π : E → B and a continuous map f : X → B, the pullback (formed in the category of topological spaces with continuous maps) X ×_{B} E is a fiber bundle over X called the pullback bundle. The associated commutative diagram is a morphism of fiber bundles. A special case is the pullback of two fiber bundles E_{1}, E_{2} → B. In this case E_{1} × E_{2} is a fiber bundle over B × B, and pulling back along the diagonal map B → B × B gives a space homeomorphic (diffeomorphic) to E_{1} ×_{B} E_{2}, which is a fiber bundle over B. All statements here hold true for differentiable manifolds as well. Differentiable maps f : M → N and g : P → N are transverse if and only if their product M × P → N × N is transverse to the diagonal of N. Thus, the pullback of two transverse differentiable maps into the same differentiable manifold is also a differentiable manifold, and the tangent space of the pullback is the pullback of the tangent spaces along the differential maps.

=== Preimages and intersections ===
Preimages of sets under functions can be described as pullbacks as follows:

Suppose f : A → B, B_{0} ⊆ B. Let g be the inclusion map B_{0} ↪ B. Then a pullback of f and g (in Set) is given by the preimage f^{−1}[B_{0}] together with the inclusion of the preimage in A

f^{−1}[B_{0}] ↪ A

and the restriction of f to f^{−1}[B_{0}]

f^{−1}[B_{0}] → B_{0}.

Because of this example, in a general category the pullback of a morphism f and a monomorphism g can be thought of as the "preimage" under f of the subobject specified by g. Similarly, pullbacks of two monomorphisms can be thought of as the "intersection" of the two subobjects.

=== Least common multiple ===

Consider the multiplicative monoid of positive integers Z_{+} as a category with one object. In this category, the pullback of two positive integers m and n is just the pair $\left(\frac{\operatorname{lcm}(m,n)}{m}, \frac{\operatorname{lcm}(m,n)}{n}\right)$, where the numerators are both the least common multiple of m and n. The same pair is also the pushout.

=== Schemes ===
Since the pushout in the category of rings, i.e., the coproduct in a category of algebras over a ring R, is given by the tensor product over R, and Spec is a contravariant functor, the pullback of two affine schemes Spec(A) and Spec(B) over Spec(R), usually called fiber product, is given by Spec(A ⊗_{R} B). By gluing schemes, one can then construct the fiber product for any two schemes over an affine base, and from there show that it exists over an arbitrary base scheme.

Fiber products of schemes are important in algebraic geometry because they provide a notion of base change, for instance from a variety over a field to a field extension, as well as allowing to define scheme-theoretic intersections and fibers of a morphism.

== Properties ==
- In any category with a terminal object T, the pullback X ×_{T} Y is just the ordinary product X × Y.
- Monomorphisms are stable under pullback: if the arrow f in the diagram is monic, then so is the arrow p_{2}. Similarly, if g is monic, then so is p_{1}.
- Isomorphisms are also stable, and hence, for example, X ×_{X} Y ≅ Y for any map Y → X (where the implied map X → X is the identity).
- In an abelian category all pullbacks exist, and they preserve kernels, in the following sense: if

is a pullback diagram, then the induced morphism ker(p_{2}) → ker(f) is an isomorphism, and so is the induced morphism ker(p_{1}) → ker(g). Every pullback diagram thus gives rise to a commutative diagram of the following form, where all rows and columns are exact:

$\begin{array}{ccccccc} &&&&0&&0\\ &&&&\downarrow&&\downarrow\\ &&&&L&=&L\\ &&&&\downarrow&&\downarrow\\ 0&\rightarrow&K&\rightarrow&P&\rightarrow&Y \\ &&\parallel&&\downarrow& & \downarrow\\ 0&\rightarrow&K&\rightarrow&X&\rightarrow&Z \end{array}$

Furthermore, in an abelian category, if X → Z is an epimorphism, then so is its pullback P → Y, and symmetrically: if Y → Z is an epimorphism, then so is its pullback P → X. In these situations, the pullback square is also a pushout square.

- There is a natural isomorphism (A×_{C}B)×_{B} D ≅ A×_{C}D. Explicitly, this means:
  - if maps f : A → C, g : B → C and h : D → B are given and
  - the pullback of f and g is given by r : P → A and s : P → B, and
  - the pullback of s and h is given by t : Q → P and u : Q → D ,
  - then the pullback of f and gh is given by rt : Q → A and u : Q → D.

Graphically this means that two pullback squares, placed side by side and sharing one morphism, form a larger pullback square when ignoring the inner shared morphism.

$\begin{array}{ccccc} Q&\xrightarrow{t}&P& \xrightarrow{r} & A \\ \downarrow_{u} & & \downarrow_{s} & &\downarrow_{f}\\ D & \xrightarrow{h} & B &\xrightarrow{g} & C \end{array}$
- Any category with pullbacks and products has equalizers.

== Weak pullbacks ==
A weak pullback of a cospan X → Z ← Y is a cone over the cospan that is only weakly universal, that is, the mediating morphism u : Q → P above is not required to be unique.

== See also ==
- Pullbacks in differential geometry
- Join (relational algebra)
