= Pepperstone =

Australian online broker

Pepperstone Group Limited
- Type: Private
- Industry: Financial services
- Founded: 2010
- Founder: Owen Kerr; Joe Davenport
- Headquarters: Melbourne, Australia
- Key people: Tamas Szabo (CEO); Andrew Housden (CFO); Tom Williams (COO); Robert Bowen (CCO); Geraldine Goh (CMO)
- Services: Online trading, Forex brokerage, MetaTrader 4, contracts for difference (CFDs), cTrader
- Website: pepperstone.com

Pepperstone is an Australian forex and CFD broker that provides trading services in forex, shares, commodities and other asset classes across multiple jurisdictions. The company was founded in 2010 in Melbourne, Australia, by Owen Kerr and Joe Davenport. The group operates internationally through regulated entities in jurisdictions including the UK, Germany, Cyprus, Kenya, Bahamas, and the UAE.

== History ==
Pepperstone was founded in 2010 by Owen Kerr and Joe Davenport but it did not receive its Australian financial services licence (AFSL) from the Australian Securities and Investments Commission (ASIC) until February 2013.

In 2014, the firm was ranked #1 on BRW Fast Starters, with reported revenues of $60m and 66% growth. In 2015, it secured authorisation from the Financial Conduct Authority (FCA) in the UK.

In 2016, Pepperstone sold a majority stake in the business to Champ Private Equity. The private equity firm exited the company in 2018, selling its stake in a management-led buyout to CEO Tamas Szabo and managing director Fiona Lock. In February 2017, to comply with its FCA obligations, the firm temporarily suspended trading for its UK clients.

In preparation for Brexit, Pepperstone sought additional regulatory authorisations in the European Union. In 2020, it secured licences from BaFin in Germany and CySEC in Cyprus. Its Dubai entity, Pepperstone Financial Services (DIFC) Limited, was licensed by the Dubai Financial Services Authority (DFSA) in March 2020. In June 2022, Pepperstone became an Approved Broker Member of the Financial Commission, a self-regulatory organization in the financial services space. In the financial year ended 30 June 2022, the UK subsidiary reported trading revenue of £10.7 million, up 36%, and profit before tax of £4.6 million, up 128%. In the following financial year, client funds decreased to £25.16 mln from £28.9 mln the previous year. Pepperstone also reduced employee and legal expenses while increasing marketing expenses. For the financial year ended June 2025, the UK subsidiary reported trading revenue of £15.0 million and net profit of £18.0 million.

In June 2024, Pepperstone introduced 24-hour CFD trading on US shares on its trading platforms cTrader, MetaTrader, and TradingView.

In December 2025, Pepperstone secured a Category 5 licence from the UAE Securities and Commodities Authority and opened a new onshore office in Dubai. In February 2026, Pepperstone launched Pepperstone Crypto, a spot cryptocurrency exchange for users in Australia. At launch, it offered five cryptocurrencies and two stablecoins paired against the Australian dollar, while its existing crypto-CFD offering remained separate. In July 2026, Pepperstone expanded its perpetual CFD offering to include gold, silver, the Nasdaq and S&P 500 indices, and WTI and Brent crude oil, with availability varying by jurisdiction.

== Regulation ==
Pepperstone operates through separately regulated entities. The group is authorised or regulated by the Australian Securities and Investments Commission (ASIC), the Financial Conduct Authority (FCA) in the United Kingdom, the Cyprus Securities and Exchange Commission (CySEC), BaFin in Germany, the Dubai Financial Services Authority (DFSA) in the Dubai International Financial Centre, the Capital Markets Authority of Kenya (CMA), and the Securities Commission of the Bahamas (SCB).

In December 2025, Pepperstone also received a Category 5 licence from the UAE Securities and Commodities Authority, now the Capital Market Authority (CMA), for onshore activities outside the Dubai International Financial Centre.

Pepperstone has offices in Melbourne, London, Düsseldorf, Dubai, Limassol, Nassau, and Nairobi, among other locations.

== Sponsorship ==
In May 2022, Pepperstone entered into a global sponsorship deal with the Association of Tennis Professionals (ATP), gaining naming rights to the official ATP rankings. In February 2024, the naming rights were transferred to the Saudi Arabian Public Investment Fund.

In 2024, Pepperstone announced a partnership with the Asian Football Confederation, hired John McEnroe as a Global Tennis Ambassador, and established partnerships with the Geelong Football Club and the Adelaide Strikers. In November 2024, the company became a sponsor of the Ultimate Fighting Championship (UFC) in Asia.

In January 2025, Pepperstone signed a multi-year sponsorship agreement with the Aston Martin Aramco F1 Team.

== Controversy ==
In November 2023, Pepperstone was identified by ASIC as one of seven CFD brokers that breached the leverage ratio limits imposed under a 2020 product intervention order. The firm self-reported that due to a technical error some retail clients were able to trade CFDs with higher leverage than permitted, and it undertook a remediation program to compensate over 1,500 affected customers. The seven issuers collectively paid or agreed to pay A$4.3 million to more than 1,500 retail clients.

In 2026, the Supreme Court of New South Wales ordered FX Group Holdings, the vehicle used in the 2018 acquisition of Champ Private Equity's stake in Pepperstone, to pay A$96.9 million plus interest to Champ's successor CPE Capital following litigation over the terms of the buyout. FX Group Holdings' shareholders included Tamas Szabo, Fiona Lock and former Pepperstone director Andrew Defina. An appeal had been lodged in December 2025 and was still pending when the payment order was reported in March 2026. Pepperstone said the dispute was between current and former shareholders and did not affect the company's operations, clients or trading activities.

=== Unlicensed operations ===
In October 2014, inquiries by the Australian Securities and Investments Commission (ASIC) revealed that Pepperstone had been providing financial services to clients in Japan without a licence from the Japanese Financial Services Agency. Pepperstone agreed to cease providing financial services in Japan, stopped accepting new Japanese clients and informed existing clients that they could close their positions and withdraw their funds by 31 December 2014. Japan was Pepperstone's most lucrative overseas market, and the exit came months before the company was reported to be planning an Australian Securities Exchange listing.

In May 2020, the Brazilian Comissão de Valores Mobiliários (CVM) issued an order for Pepperstone to cease offering its services in Brazil without authorisation, under penalty of a daily fine. The regulator alleged that Pepperstone had been attracting Brazilian clients via its website and social media despite not being licensed domestically.

=== Insider trading case ===
In 2014, Pepperstone employee Joel Murphy, then the company's head of operations, identified suspicious trading by client Lukas Kamay and alerted the Australian Securities and Investments Commission. The resulting investigation uncovered an insider-trading scheme involving Kamay and Australian Bureau of Statistics employee Christopher Hill, through which Kamay made more than $7 million in profits. The Herald Sun reported that Pepperstone dismissed Murphy on the day Kamay and Hill were arrested and that Murphy disputed unpaid bonuses with the company.

== See also ==
- List of electronic trading platforms
