= ATP rankings =

Association of Tennis Professionals rankings

The PIF ATP Rankings (previously known as the Pepperstone ATP Rankings) are the merit-based method used by the Association of Tennis Professionals (ATP) for determining the qualification for entry as well as the seeding of players in all singles and doubles tournaments. The first rankings for singles were published on 23 August 1973 while the doubles players were ranked for the first time on 1 March 1976. Ranking points are awarded according to the stage of tournament reached, and the prestige of the tournament, with the four Grand Slam tournaments awarding the most points. The rankings are updated every Monday, and points are dropped 52 weeks after being awarded (with the exception of the ATP Finals, from which points are dropped on the Monday following the last ATP Tour event of the following year).

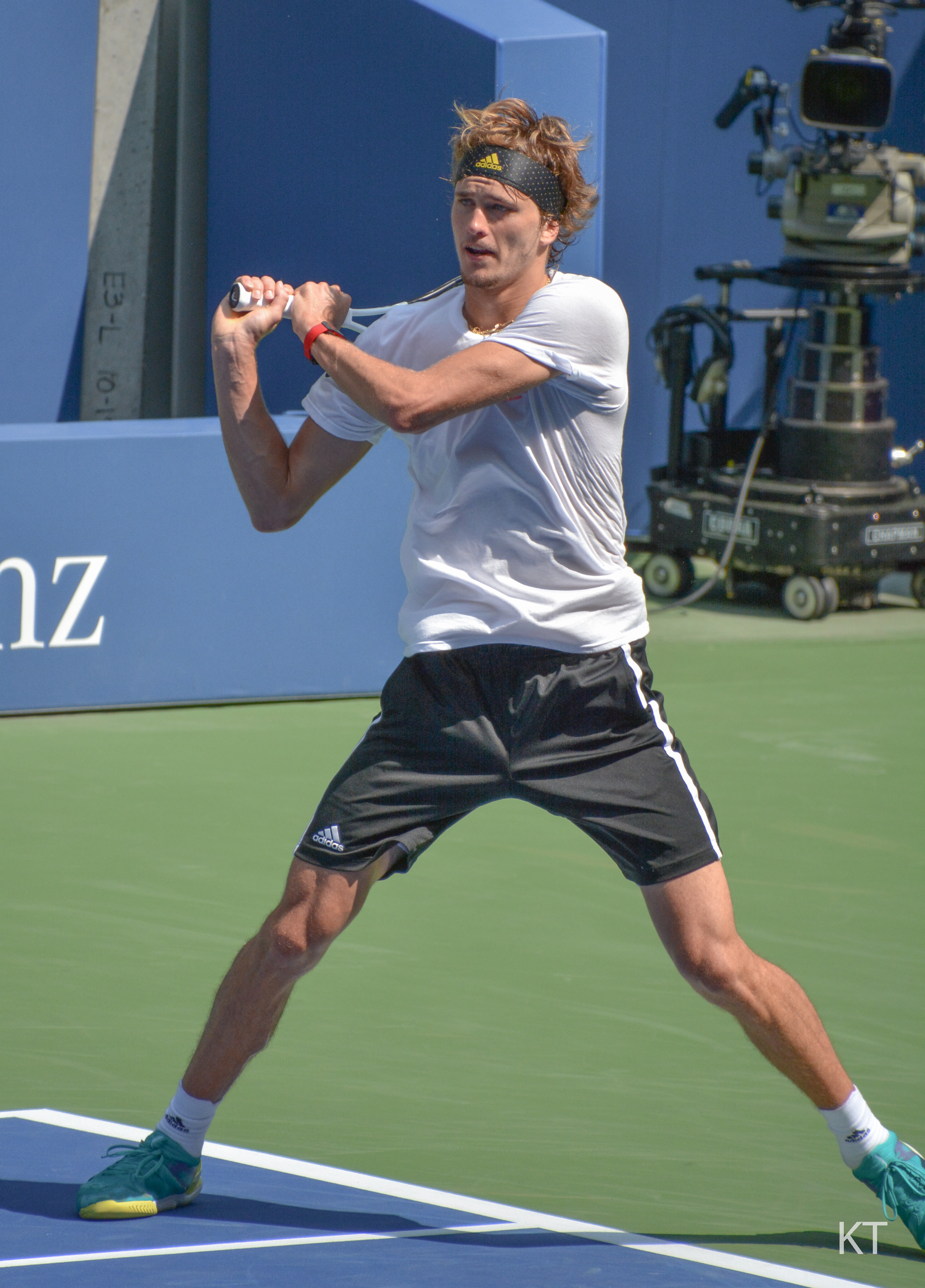
Alexander Zverev, men's singles No. 1

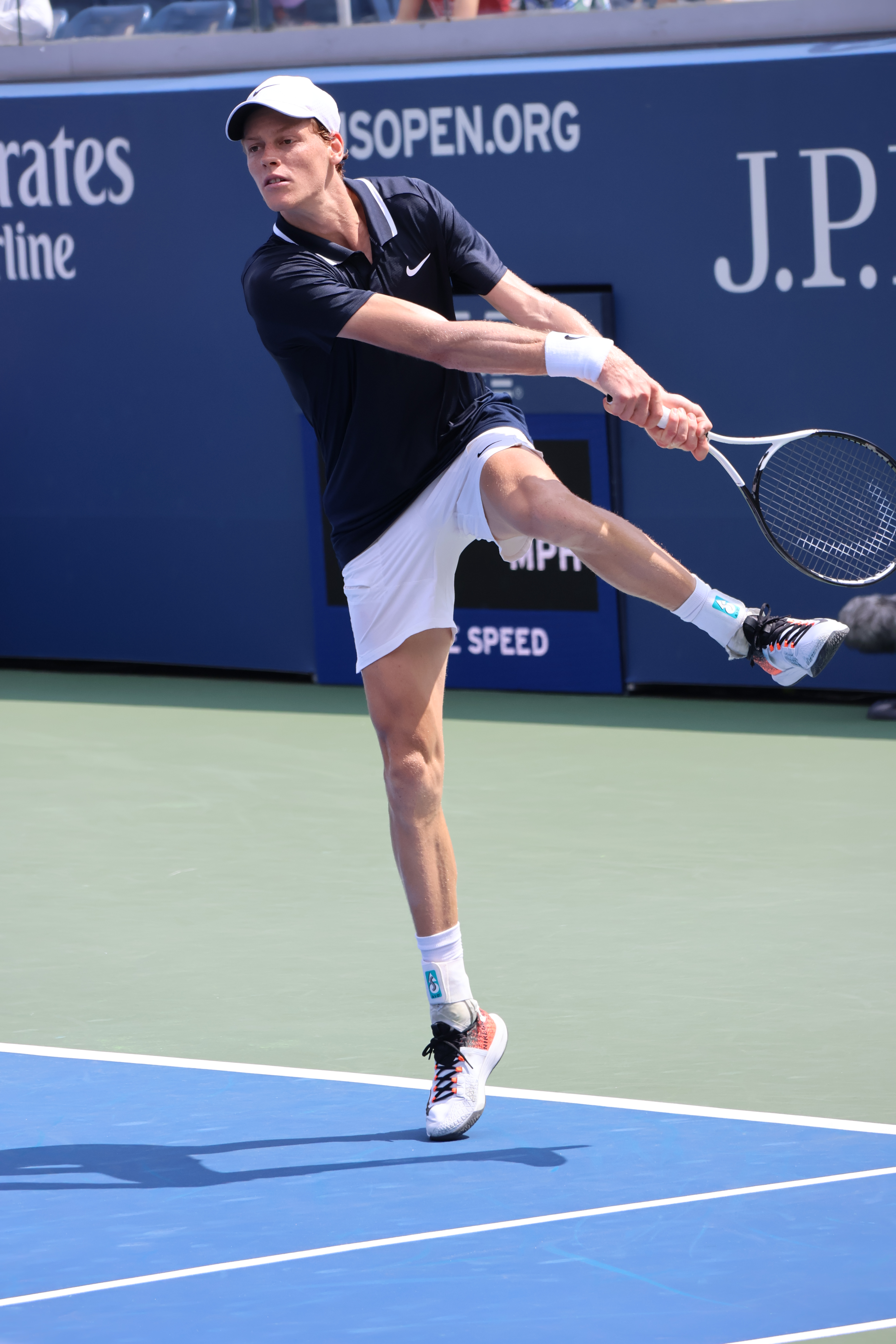
Jannik Sinner, men's singles No. 2

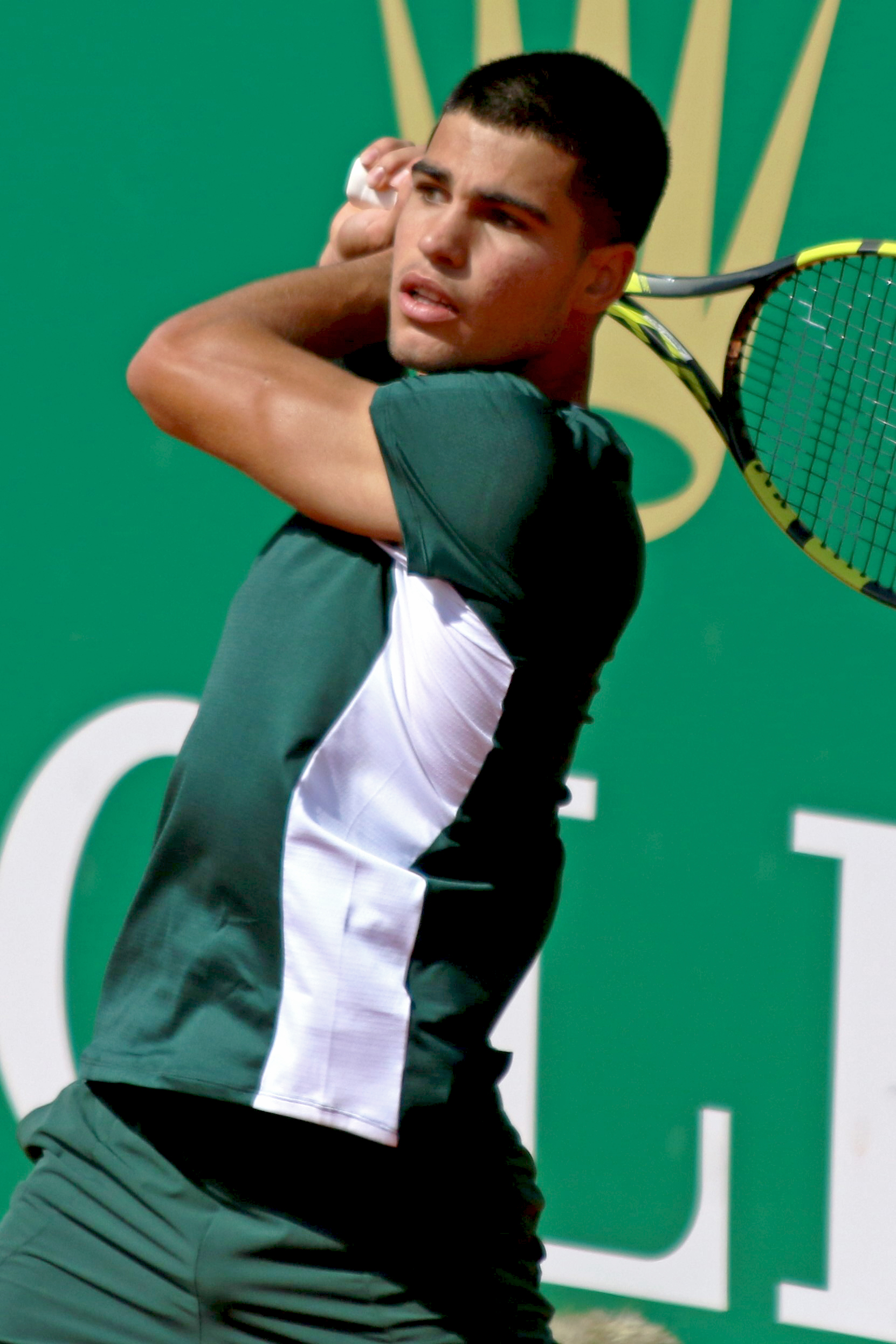
Carlos Alcaraz, men's singles No. 3

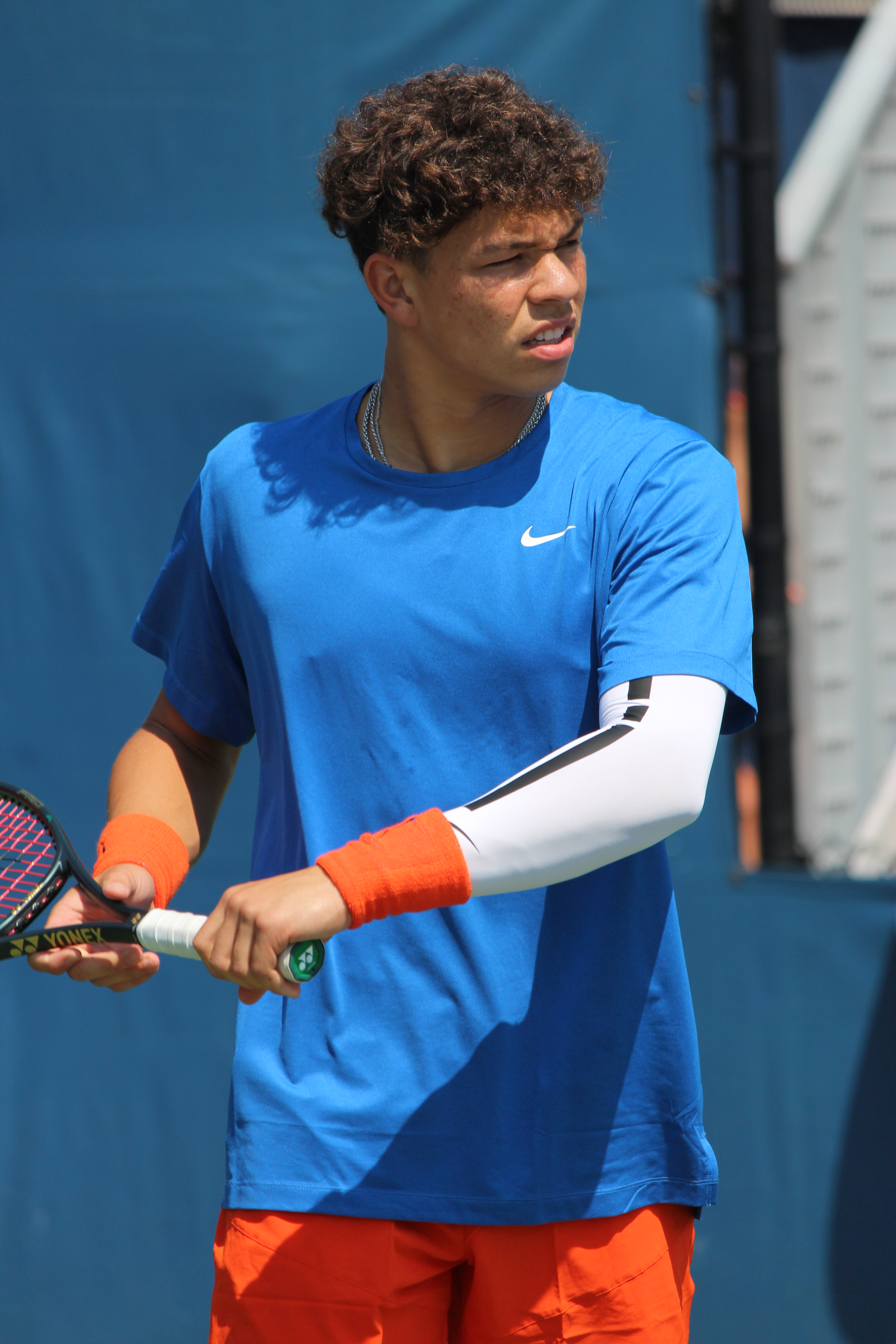
Ben Shelton, men's singles No. 4

== History ==
The ATP began as the men's trade union in 1972, through the combined plays of Jack Kramer, Cliff Drysdale, and Donald Dell, and rose to prominence when 81 of its members boycotted the 1973 Wimbledon Championships. Just two months later, in August, the ATP introduced its ranking system intended to objectify tournament entry criteria, which up to that point were controlled by national federations and tournament directors.

The ATP's new ranking system was quickly adopted by men's tennis. While virtually all ATP members were in favor of objectifying event participation, the system's first No. 1, Ilie Năstase, lamented that "everyone had a number hanging over them", fostering a more competitive and less collegial atmosphere among the players.

The original ATP ranking criteria, which were then regularly published weekly only from mid-1979 and persisted through the 1980s, were based on averaging each player's results, though the details were revised a number of times. Starting in 1990, in conjunction with the expansion of ATP purview as the new men's tour operator, the ranking criteria were replaced with a 'best of' system modeled after competitive downhill skiing. This 'best of' system originally used 14 events but expanded to 18 in 2000. The computer that calculates the rankings is nicknamed "Blinky".

== Overview ==
A player's ATP ranking is based on the total points they accrued in the following 20 tournaments (19 if they did not qualify for the ATP Finals):

- The four Grand Slam tournaments
- The eight mandatory ATP Masters 1000 tournaments, (Note: In weeks where there are not four Grand Slam tournaments and eight Masters 1000 tournaments in the ranking period, the number of a player's best results from all eligible tournaments in the ranking period will be adjusted accordingly.)
- The previous ATP Finals count until the Monday following the final regular-season ATP event of the following year.
- The best seven results from the non-mandatory ATP Masters 1000, all ATP 500 series, ATP 250 series, ATP Challenger Tour, Futures Series and United Cup tournaments played in the calendar year (Note: At least one of these tournaments must follow the US Open.)

Ranking points gained in a tournament are dropped 52 weeks later, with the exception of the ATP Finals, from which points are dropped on the Monday following the last ATP Tour event of the following year.

The Monte-Carlo Masters 1000 became optional in 2009, but if a player chooses to participate in it, its result is counted and his fourth-best result in an ATP 500 event is ignored (his three best ATP 500 results remain). From 2009 until 2015, if a player did not play enough ATP 500 events and did not have an ATP 250 or Challenger appearance with a better result, the Davis Cup was counted in the 500's table. The World Team Cup was also included before its cancellation in 2012.

For the Davis Cup, from 2009 until 2015, points were distributed for the World Group countries. Instead of having an exact drop date they were gradually updated at each phase of the competition, comparing the player's results with his results from the previous year. (e.g. if a player played two matches in a semifinal but plays one the next year only that one missing match would be extracted from his points).

A player who is out of competition for 30 or more days, due to a verified injury, will not receive any penalty. The ATP Finals will count as an additional 20th tournament in the ranking of its eight qualifiers at season's end.

For every Grand Slam tournament or mandatory ATP Masters 1000 tournament for which a player is not in the main draw, and was not (and, in the case of a Grand Slam tournament, would not have been, had he and all other players entered) a main draw direct acceptance on the original acceptance list, and never became a main draw direct acceptance, the number of his results from all other eligible tournaments in the ranking period that count for his ranking is increased by one.

Once a player is accepted in the main draw of a Grand Slam tournament or ATP Masters 1000 tournament, (Note: "Accepted" means a direct acceptance, a qualifier, a special exempt, or a lucky loser, or having accepted a wild card.) his result in this tournament counts for his ranking, regardless of whether he participates. A player's withdrawal from an ATP 500 event, regardless of whether the withdrawal was on time, results in a zero point included as one of his best of four results. Further non-consecutive withdrawals results in a zero point allocation replacing the next best positive result for each additional withdrawal.

Players with multiple consecutive withdrawals who are out of competition for 30 days or longer because of injury are not subject to a ranking penalty as long as verified and approved medical forms are provided; or, a player will not have the ranking penalty imposed if he completes the Promotional Activities requirement as specified under "Repeal of Withdrawal Fines and/or Penalties" or if the on-site withdrawal procedures apply. Players may also appeal withdrawal penalties to a Tribunal who will determine whether the penalties are affirmed or set aside.

Between 2000 and 2012, ranking points were awarded based on results in the Summer Olympics. This was changed before the 2016 Olympics where no ranking points were awarded.

With these rules, a player playing and winning the mandatory 4 Grand Slams and 8 ATP Masters 1000 events, a further 6 ATP 500 events and the Monte-Carlo Masters 1000 can amass a total of 20,000 points before the ATP Finals and end the calendar year with a maximum of 21,500 points. As of 2022, the maximum points achieved by any player since 2009 is 16,950 by Novak Djokovic, on 6 June 2016.

For the 2024 season, the points breakdown was adjusted to award more points in ATP Tour events.

The player at the top of the standings come the end of the season will win the ATP No.1 Trophy, designed and made by British silversmiths, Thomas Lyte, as part of a five-year silverware deal with the ATP.

== ATP race ==
The ATP Race is an annual performance-based points race to determine the qualifiers for the year-end championship, in addition to the year-end No. 1 singles player and doubles team. The race, initially called the "ATP Champions Race", was introduced by the ATP for the 2000 season as part of their "21st Century Tennis" strategy announced in 1999. All players and teams start the year with zero points, and accumulate points from tournament to tournament based on their performances. The player and team who end the season with the most points are crowned as the year-end No. 1 in their disciplines, and the top-eight players and teams participate in the season-ending championship, the ATP Finals.

== Ranking method ==
Since the introduction of the ATP rankings the method used to calculate a player's ranking points has changed several times. The last major overhaul to the points system was in 2009.

=== Points distribution (2024–present) ===
Ranking points are awarded as follows:

Tournament category	W	F	SF	QF	R16	R32	R64	R128	Q	Q3	Q2	Q1
ATP Tour
Grand Slam	2000	1300	800	400	200	100	50	10	30	16	8	
ATP Finals	+900 (1500 max)	+400 (1000 max)	200 for each round robin match win (600 max)									
ATP 1000 (96D)	1000	650	400	200	100	50	30	10	20		10	
ATP 1000 (56D)	1000	650	400	200	100	50	10		30		16	
ATP 500 (48D)	500	330	200	100	50	25			16		8	
ATP 500 (32D)	500	330	200	100	50				25		13	
ATP 250 (48D)	250	165	100	50	25	13			8		4	
ATP 250 (32D)	250	165	100	50	25				13		7	
ATP Challenger Tour
Challenger 175	175	90	50	25	13				6		3	
Challenger 125	125	64	35	16	8				5		3	
Challenger 100	100	50	25	14	7				4		2	
Challenger 75	75	44	22	12	6				4		2	
Challenger 50	50	25	14	8	4				3		1	
ITF Men's World Tennis Tour
Futures M25	25	16	8	3	1							
Futures M15	15	8	4	2	1							

- Players who draw a bye in the first round in the ATP 1000 series and lose their first match in the second round are considered to have lost their first round and receive the points equivalent to first round loss. Similarly, loss in the second round of the ATP 500 series and the ATP 250 series after drawing bye in first round will result in 0 points being awarded.

In addition qualifiers and main draw entry players will then also receive the points in brackets for the rounds they reached.

Starting in 2016, points were no longer awarded for Davis Cup ties, nor for the tennis tournament at the Summer Olympics.

Since a new team competition United Cup was introduced, its participants are also eligible to receive ATP ranking points for won matches (up to 500 points for the entire tournament). Since 2024, the point distribution is as follows:

Round	Points per win vs. opponent ranked						
Round	No. 1–10	No. 11–20	No. 21–30	No. 31–50	No. 51–100	No. 101–250	No. 251+
Final	180	140	120	90	60	40	35
Semifinals	130	105	90	60	40	35	25
Quarterfinals	80	65	55	40	35	25	20
Group stage	55	45	40	35	25	20	15

=== Points distribution (2009–2023) ===
Category	W	F	SF	QF	R16	R32	R64	R128	Q	Q3	Q2	Q1
Grand Slam (128S)	2000	1200	720	360	180	90	45	10	25	16	8	0
Grand Slam (64D)	2000	1200	720	360	180	90	0	—	25	—	0	0
ATP Finals (8S/8D)	1500 (max) 1100 (min)	1000 (max) 600 (min)	600 (max); 200 (min)	200 for each round robin match win, +400 for a semifinal win, +500 for the final win.								
ATP Tour Masters 1000 (96S)	1000	600	360	180	90	45	25	10	16	—	8	0
ATP Tour Masters 1000 (56S/48S)	1000	600	360	180	90	45	10	—	25	—	16	0
ATP Tour Masters 1000 (32D)	1000	600	360	180	90	0	—					
ATP Tour 500 (48S)	500	300	180	90	45	20	0	—	10	—	4	0
ATP Tour 500 (32S)	500	300	180	90	45	0	—		20	—	10	0
ATP Tour 500 (16D)	500	300	180	90	0	—			45	—	25	0
ATP Tour 250 (48S)	250	150	90	45	20	10	0	—	5	—	3	0
ATP Tour 250 (32S/28S)	250	150	90	45	20	0	—		12	—	6	0
ATP Tour 250 (16D)	250	150	90	45	0	—						

=== Points distribution (2000–2008) ===
From 2000 to 2008, the amount of points awarded was roughly half of what they would be beginning in 2009. Within the lowest two tiers, points awarded varied based on the prize money of each tournament. The points awarded to winners is as follows:

- Grand Slam: 1000
- Tennis Masters Cup: 750 (maximum)
- ATP Masters Series: 500
- ATP International Series Gold: 250–300
- ATP International Series: 175–250

== Current rankings ==
=== Singles ===
Singles race rankings as of 9 November 2026
No.	Player	Points	Tourn
1	Alexander Zverev (GER) ✓	9,350	19
2	Jannik Sinner (ITA) No	7,950	9
3	Carlos Alcaraz (ESP) ✓	6,100	11
4	Ben Shelton (USA) ✓	5,170	21
5	Daniil Medvedev ✓	3,820	24
6	Flavio Cobolli (ITA) ✓	3,680	24
7	Arthur Fils (FRA) ✓	3,625	18
8	Frances Tiafoe (USA) ✓	3,390	22
9	Rafael Jódar (ESP) ✓	3,234	21
10	Alex de Minaur (AUS)	3,170	23
11	Taylor Fritz (USA)	3,050	20
12	Novak Djokovic (SRB)	2,940	11
13	Tommy Paul (USA)	2,925	23
14	Jiří Lehečka (CZE)	2,540	22
15	Jakub Menšík (CZE)	2,450	20
16	Félix Auger-Aliassime (CAN)	2,440	18
17	Casper Ruud (NOR)	2,435	19
18	Alejandro Davidovich Fokina (ESP)	2,400	19
19	Brandon Nakashima (USA)	2,360	23
20	Francisco Cerúndolo (ARG)	2,220	25

✓ Qualified for the 2026 ATP Finals.

[ · ]

ATP rankings (singles) as of 16 November 2026
No.	Player	Points	Move
1	Alexander Zverev (GER)	9,350	Steady
2	Jannik Sinner (ITA)	7,950	Steady
3	Carlos Alcaraz (ESP)	6,100	Steady
4	Ben Shelton (USA)	5,170	Steady
5	Daniil Medvedev	3,820	Steady
6	Flavio Cobolli (ITA)	3,680	Steady
7	Arthur Fils (FRA)	3,625	Steady
8	Frances Tiafoe (USA)	3,390	Steady
9	Taylor Fritz (USA)	3,300	▲1
10	Rafael Jódar (ESP)	3,234	▲1
11	Alex de Minaur (AUS)	3,170	▼2
12	Novak Djokovic (SRB)	2,940	Steady
13	Tommy Paul (USA)	2,925	Steady
14	Jiří Lehečka (CZE)	2,540	▲1
15	Jakub Menšík (CZE)	2,500	▲1
16	Alejandro Davidovich Fokina (ESP)	2,500	▲1
17	Félix Auger-Aliassime (CAN)	2,465	▼3
18	Casper Ruud (NOR)	2,435	Steady
19	Brandon Nakashima (USA)	2,360	Steady
20	Francisco Cerúndolo (ARG)	2,220	Steady

=== Doubles ===
Doubles race rankings as of 9 November 2026
No.	Team	Points	Tourn
1	Harri Heliövaara (FIN) ✓ Henry Patten (GBR) ✓	8,330	17
2	Christian Harrison (USA) ✓ Neal Skupski (GBR) ✓	6,760	22
3	Marcel Granollers (ESP) ✓ Horacio Zeballos (ARG) ✓	5,330	13
4	Marcelo Arévalo (ESA); Mate Pavić (CRO) ✓	5,045	20
5	Simone Bolelli (ITA); Andrea Vavassori (ITA) ✓	4,840	19
6	Théo Arribagé (FRA); Albano Olivetti (FRA) ✓	4,530	30
7	Kevin Krawietz (GER); Tim Pütz (GER) ✓	4,470	17
8	Orlando Luz (BRA); Rafael Matos (BRA) ✓	3,995	30
9	Guido Andreozzi (ARG); Manuel Guinard (FRA)	3,955	25
10	Julian Cash (GBR); Lloyd Glasspool (GBR)	3,820	25

✓ Qualified for the 2026 ATP Finals.

[ · ]

ATP rankings (doubles) as of 9 November 2026
No.	Player	Points	Move
1	Harri Heliövaara (FIN)	9,630	Steady
=	Henry Patten (GBR)	9,630	Steady
3	Neal Skupski (GBR)	7,490	Steady
4	Christian Harrison (USA)	6,580	Steady
5	Horacio Zeballos (ARG)	5,530	Steady
6	Marcel Granollers (ESP)	5,530	Steady
7	Andrea Vavassori (ITA)	5,450	Steady
8	Marcelo Arévalo (ESA)	5,200	Steady
9	Mate Pavić (CRO)	5,200	Steady
10	Simone Bolelli (ITA)	5,150	Steady
11	Kevin Krawietz (GER)	4,940	Steady
12	Tim Pütz (GER)	4,670	Steady
13	Neil Oberleitner (AUT)	3,975	▲6
14	Albano Olivetti (FRA)	3,880	▼1
15	Théo Arribagé (FRA)	3,880	▼1
16	Lucas Miedler (AUT)	3,750	▲4
17	Rafael Matos (BRA)	3,735	Steady
18	Orlando Luz (BRA)	3,735	Steady
19	Manuel Guinard (FRA)	3,730	▼4
20	Guido Andreozzi (ARG)	3,730	▼4

== ATP No. 1 ranked singles players ==
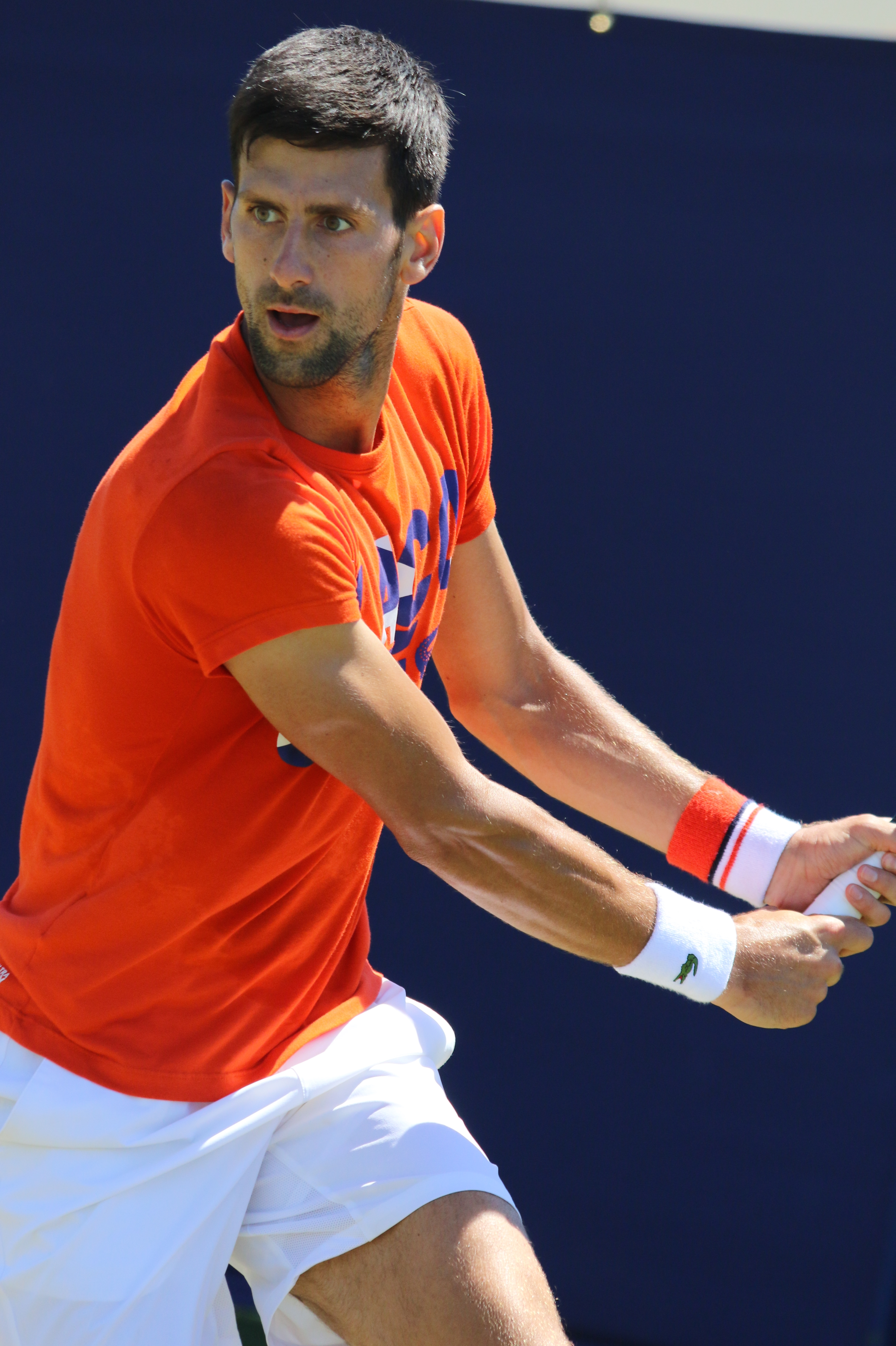
Novak Djokovic has been ranked world No. 1 in a record of 13 different years. He holds the records for the most weeks spent as No. 1 (428), the most year-end No. 1 finishes (8), and the most ranking points ever accumulated by any player (16,950).

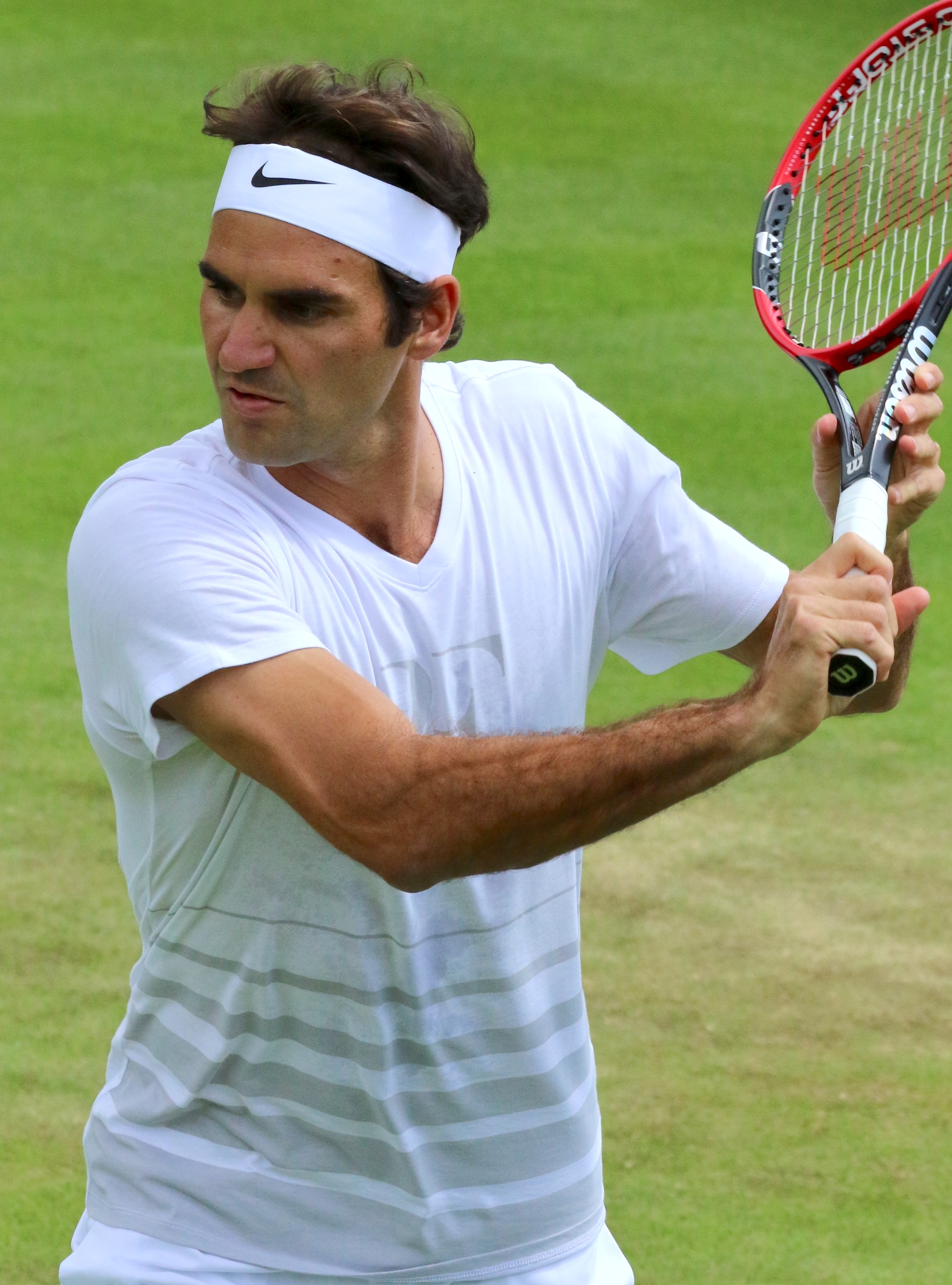
Roger Federer holds the all-time ATP record for the most consecutive weeks ranked as the world No. 1, with 237 consecutive weeks. He held the top spot uninterrupted from February 2, 2004, until August 17, 2008. This streak spans over four and a half years, more than 70 weeks longer than the next best streak. He is also the only male player to hold the top spot for over 200 consecutive weeks.

Current world No. 1 as of 23 November 2026.
Active former No. 1 player.

Weeks	World No. 1 player	First reached
428	Novak Djokovic (SRB)	4 Jul 2011
310	Roger Federer (SUI)	2 Feb 2004
286	Pete Sampras (USA)	12 Apr 1993
270	Ivan Lendl (USA) (TCH)	28 Feb 1983
268	Jimmy Connors (USA)	29 Jul 1974
209	Rafael Nadal (ESP)	18 Aug 2008
170	John McEnroe (USA)	3 Mar 1980
109	Björn Borg (SWE)	23 Aug 1977
101	Andre Agassi (USA)	10 Apr 1995
95	Jannik Sinner (ITA)	10 Jun 2024
80	Lleyton Hewitt (AUS)	19 Nov 2001
72	Stefan Edberg (SWE)	13 Aug 1990
66	Carlos Alcaraz (ESP)	Sep 12, 2022
58	Jim Courier (USA)	10 Feb 1992
43	Gustavo Kuerten (BRA)	4 Dec 2000
41	Andy Murray (GBR)	7 Nov 2016
40	Ilie Năstase (ROU)	23 Aug 1973
20	Mats Wilander (SWE)	12 Sep 1988
16	Daniil Medvedev (RUS)	28 Feb 2022
13	Andy Roddick (USA)	3 Nov 2003
12	Boris Becker (GER)	28 Jan 1991
9	Marat Safin (RUS)	20 Nov 2000
8	John Newcombe (AUS)	3 Jun 1974
8	Juan Carlos Ferrero (ESP)	8 Sep 2003
6	Thomas Muster (AUT)	12 Feb 1996
6	Marcelo Ríos (CHI)	30 Mar 1998
6	Yevgeny Kafelnikov (RUS)	3 May 1999
4	Alexander Zverev (GER)	2 Nov 2026
2	Carlos Moyá (ESP)	15 Mar 1999
1	Patrick Rafter (AUS)	26 Jul 1999
30 players

Year-end No. 1
8	Novak Djokovic (SRB)
6	Pete Sampras (USA)
5	Jimmy Connors (USA)
5	Roger Federer (SUI)
5	Rafael Nadal (ESP)
4	John McEnroe (USA)
4	Ivan Lendl (TCH)
2	Björn Borg (SWE)
2	Stefan Edberg (SWE)
2	Lleyton Hewitt (AUS)
2	Carlos Alcaraz (ESP)
1	Ilie Năstase (ROU)
1	Mats Wilander (SWE)
1	Jim Courier (USA)
1	Andre Agassi (USA)
1	Gustavo Kuerten (BRA)
1	Andy Roddick (USA)
1	Andy Murray (GBR)
1	Jannik Sinner (ITA)
1	Alexander Zverev (GER)
20 players

== Players with highest career rank 2–5 ==
The following is a list of players who were ranked world No. 5 or higher but not No. 1 since the 1973 introduction of the ATP rankings (active players in bold).

World No. 2
Player	Date reached
(Spain) Manuel Orantes	23 Aug 1973
(Australia) Ken Rosewall	30 Apr 1975
(Argentina) Guillermo Vilas	30 Apr 1975
(United States) Arthur Ashe	10 May 1976
(Germany) Michael Stich	22 Nov 1993
(Socialist Federal Republic of Yugoslavia) / (Croatia) Goran Ivanišević	4 Jul 1994
(United States) Michael Chang	9 Sep 1996
(Czech Republic) Petr Korda	2 Feb 1998
(Spain) Àlex Corretja	1 Feb 1999
(Sweden) Magnus Norman	12 Jun 2000
(Germany) Tommy Haas	13 May 2002
(Norway) **Casper Ruud**	12 Sep 2022

World No. 3
Player	Date reached
(United States) Stan Smith	23 Aug 1973
(Netherlands) Tom Okker	2 Mar 1974
(Australia) Rod Laver	9 Aug 1974
(United States) Brian Gottfried	19 Jun 1977
(United States) Vitas Gerulaitis	27 Feb 1978
(France) Yannick Noah	7 Jul 1986
(Spain) Sergi Bruguera	1 Aug 1994
(Argentina) Guillermo Coria	3 May 2004
(Argentina) David Nalbandian	20 Mar 2006
(Croatia) Ivan Ljubičić	1 May 2006
(Russia) Nikolay Davydenko	6 Nov 2006
(Spain) David Ferrer	8 Jul 2013
(Switzerland) Stan Wawrinka	27 Jan 2014
(Canada) Milos Raonic	21 Nov 2016
(Bulgaria) **Grigor Dimitrov**	20 Nov 2017
(Croatia) **Marin Čilić**	29 Jan 2018
(Argentina) Juan Martín del Potro	13 Aug 2018
(Austria) Dominic Thiem	2 Mar 2020
(Greece) **Stefanos Tsitsipas**	9 Aug 2021

World No. 4
Player	Date reached
(Italy) Adriano Panatta	24 Aug 1976
(Mexico) Raúl Ramírez	7 Nov 1976
(United States) Roscoe Tanner	30 Jul 1979
(United States) Gene Mayer	6 Oct 1980
(Argentina) José Luis Clerc	3 Aug 1981
(Czechoslovakia) Miloslav Mečíř	22 Feb 1988
(Australia) Pat Cash	9 May 1988
(United States) Brad Gilbert	1 Jan 1990
(Ecuador) Andrés Gómez	11 Jun 1990
(France) Guy Forget	25 Mar 1991
(Ukraine) Andrei Medvedev	16 May 1994
(United Kingdom) Greg Rusedski	6 Oct 1997
(Sweden) Jonas Björkman	3 Nov 1997
(Netherlands) Richard Krajicek	29 Mar 1999
(United States) Todd Martin	13 Sep 1999
(Sweden) Thomas Enqvist	15 Nov 1999
(Germany) Nicolas Kiefer	10 Jan 2000
(United Kingdom) Tim Henman	8 Jul 2002
(France) Sébastien Grosjean	28 Oct 2002
(United States) James Blake	20 Nov 2006
(Sweden) Robin Söderling	15 Nov 2010
(Japan) Kei Nishikori	2 Mar 2015
(Czech Republic) Tomáš Berdych	18 May 2015
(Denmark) **Holger Rune**	21 Aug 2023
(United States) **Taylor Fritz**	18 Nov 2024
(United Kingdom) **Jack Draper**	9 Jun 2025
(Canada) **Félix Auger-Aliassime**	8 Jun 2026
(United States) **Ben Shelton**	14 Sep 2026

World No. 5
Player	Date reached
(Czechoslovakia) Jan Kodeš	13 Sep 1973
(United States) Eddie Dibbs	24 Jul 1978
(United States) Harold Solomon	8 Sep 1980
(United States) Jimmy Arias	9 Apr 1984
(Sweden) Anders Järryd	22 Jul 1985
(South Africa) / (United States) Kevin Curren	22 Jul 1985
(France) Henri Leconte	22 Sep 1986
(France) Cédric Pioline	8 May 2000
(Czech Republic) Jiří Novák	21 Oct 2002
(Germany) Rainer Schüttler	26 Apr 2004
(Argentina) Gastón Gaudio	25 Apr 2005
(Spain) Tommy Robredo	28 Aug 2006
(Chile) Fernando González	29 Jan 2007
(France) Jo-Wilfried Tsonga	27 Feb 2012
(South Africa) Kevin Anderson	16 Jul 2018
(Russia) **Andrey Rublev**	13 Sep 2021
(Italy) **Lorenzo Musetti**	12 Jan 2026
(Australia) **Alex de Minaur**	13 Jul 2026

== Players with highest career rank 6–10 ==
The following is a list of players who were ranked world No. 6 to No. 10 since the 1973 introduction of the ATP rankings (active players in bold).

World No. 6
Player	Date reached
(United States) Eliot Teltscher	7 Jun 1982
(Spain) José Higueras	13 Jun 1983
(Sweden) Henrik Sundström	8 Oct 1984
(Sweden) Kent Carlsson	19 Sep 1988
(United States) Aaron Krickstein	26 Feb 1990
(South Africa) Wayne Ferreira	8 May 1995
(Slovakia) Karol Kučera	14 Sep 1998
(Ecuador) Nicolás Lapentti	17 Apr 2000
(Spain) Albert Costa	22 Jul 2002
(France) Gilles Simon	5 Jan 2009
(France) Gaël Monfils	7 Nov 2016
(Italy) **Matteo Berrettini**	31 Jan 2022
(Poland) **Hubert Hurkacz**	5 Aug 2024
(Italy) **Flavio Cobolli**	24 Aug 2026

World No. 7
Player	Date reached
(Italy) Corrado Barazzutti	21 Aug 1978
(United States) Brian Teacher	5 Oct 1981
(United States) Sandy Mayer	26 Apr 1982
(Australia) Peter McNamara	14 Mar 1983
(South Africa) / (United States) Johan Kriek	10 Sep 1984
(Spain) Juan Aguilera	17 Sep 1984
(Sweden) Joakim Nyström	31 Mar 1986
(United States) Tim Mayotte	31 Oct 1988
(Switzerland) Jakob Hlasek	17 Apr 1989
(United States) Jay Berger	16 Apr 1990
(Spain) Emilio Sánchez	30 Apr 1990
(Spain) Alberto Berasategui	14 Nov 1994
(Sweden) Thomas Johansson	10 Jun 2002
(Croatia) Mario Ančić	10 Jul 2006
(France) Richard Gasquet	9 Jul 2007
(Spain) Fernando Verdasco	20 Apr 2009
(United States) Mardy Fish	15 Aug 2011
(Belgium) David Goffin	20 Nov 2017
(France) **Arthur Fils**	2 Nov 2026

World No. 8
Player	Date reached
(Australia) Tony Roche	16 Nov 1975
(Australia) John Alexander	15 Dec 1975
(United States) Dick Stockton	31 Oct 1977
(United States) Peter Fleming	7 Jul 1980
(Argentina) Alberto Mancini	9 Oct 1989
(Czechoslovakia) Karel Nováček	18 Nov 1991
(Australia) Mark Philippoussis	19 Apr 1999
(Argentina) Guillermo Cañas	6 Jun 2005
(Czech Republic) Radek Štěpánek	10 Jul 2006
(Cyprus) Marcos Baghdatis	21 Aug 2006
(Russia) Mikhail Youzhny	28 Jan 2008
(Austria) Jürgen Melzer	18 Apr 2011
(Serbia) Janko Tipsarević	2 Apr 2012
(United States) Jack Sock	20 Nov 2017
(United States) John Isner	16 Jul 2018
(Russia) **Karen Khachanov**	15 Jul 2019
(Argentina) Diego Schwartzman	12 Oct 2020
(United Kingdom) **Cameron Norrie**	12 Sep 2022
(United States) **Tommy Paul**	9 Jun 2025
(United States) **Frances Tiafoe**	14 Sep 2026

World No. 9
Player	Date reached
(Soviet Union) Alex Metreveli	3 Jun 1974
(Paraguay) Víctor Pecci	24 Mar 1980
(United States) Bill Scanlon	9 Jan 1984
(Soviet Union) Andrei Chesnokov	8 Apr 1991
(Switzerland) Marc Rosset	11 Sep 1995
(Thailand) Paradorn Srichaphan	12 May 2003
(Chile) Nicolás Massú	13 Sep 2004
(Sweden) Joachim Johansson	14 Feb 2005
(Argentina) Mariano Puerta	15 Aug 2005
(Spain) Nicolás Almagro	2 May 2011
(Italy) Fabio Fognini	15 Jul 2019
(Spain) Roberto Bautista Agut	4 Nov 2019

World No. 10
Player	Date reached
(United States) Tom Gorman	1 May 1974
(Poland) Wojciech Fibak	25 Jul 1977
(France) Thierry Tulasne	4 Aug 1986
(Sweden) Mikael Pernfors	22 Sep 1986
(Argentina) Martín Jaite	9 Jul 1990
(Sweden) Jonas Svensson	25 Mar 1991
(Sweden) Magnus Gustafsson	29 Jul 1991
(Spain) Carlos Costa	18 May 1992
(Sweden) Magnus Larsson	17 Apr 1995
(Spain) Félix Mantilla	8 Jun 1998
(France) Arnaud Clément	2 Apr 2001
(Argentina) Juan Mónaco	23 Jul 2012
(Latvia) Ernests Gulbis	9 Jun 2014
(Spain) **Pablo Carreño Busta**	11 Sep 2017
(France) **Lucas Pouille**	19 Mar 2018
(Canada) **Denis Shapovalov**	21 Sep 2020
(Kazakhstan) **Alexander Bublik**	12 Jan 2026
(Spain) **Rafael Jódar**	2 Nov 2026

== Year-end Top 10 ==
★ indicates player's highest year-end ranking

Year	No. 1	No. 2	No. 3	No. 4	No. 5	No. 6	No. 7	No. 8	No. 9	No. 10
1973	(Romania) I. Năstase^{★}	(Australia) J. Newcombe^{★}	(United States) J. Connors	(Netherlands) T. Okker^{★}	(United States) S. Smith^{★}	(Australia) K. Rosewall^{★}	(Spain) M. Orantes	(Australia) R. Laver	(Czechoslovakia) J. Kodeš^{★}	(United States) A. Ashe
1974 (Note: The official ATP year-end rankings were listed from 17 January 1975.)	(United States) J. Connors^{★}	(Australia) J. Newcombe	(Sweden) B. Borg	(Australia) R. Laver^{★}	(Argentina) G. Vilas	(Netherlands) T. Okker	(United States) A. Ashe	(Australia) K. Rosewall	(United States) S. Smith	(Romania) I. Năstase
1975	(United States) J. Connors	(Argentina) G. Vilas^{★}	(Sweden) B. Borg	(United States) A. Ashe^{★}	(Spain) M. Orantes	(Australia) K. Rosewall	(Romania) I. Năstase	(Australia) J. Alexander^{★}	(United States) R. Tanner	(Australia) R. Laver
1976	(United States) J. Connors	(Sweden) B. Borg	(Romania) I. Năstase	(Spain) M. Orantes^{★}	(Mexico) R. Ramírez^{★}	(Argentina) G. Vilas	(Italy) A. Panatta^{★}	(United States) H. Solomon	(United States) E. Dibbs	(United States) B. Gottfried
1977	(United States) J. Connors	(Argentina) G. Vilas	(Sweden) B. Borg	(United States) V. Gerulaitis^{★}	(United States) B. Gottfried^{★}	(United States) E. Dibbs^{★}	(Spain) M. Orantes	(Mexico) R. Ramírez	(Romania) I. Năstase	(United States) D. Stockton^{★}
1978 (Note: The official ATP year-end rankings were listed from 3 January 1979.)	(United States) J. Connors	(Sweden) B. Borg	(Argentina) G. Vilas	(United States) J. McEnroe	(United States) V. Gerulaitis	(United States) E. Dibbs	(United States) B. Gottfried	(Mexico) R. Ramírez	(United States) H. Solomon	(Italy) C. Barazzutti^{★}
1979 (Note: The official ATP year-end rankings were listed from 7 January 1980.)	(Sweden) B. Borg^{★}	(United States) J. Connors	(United States) J. McEnroe	(United States) V. Gerulaitis	(United States) R. Tanner^{★}	(Argentina) G. Vilas	(United States) A. Ashe	(United States) H. Solomon	(Spain) J. Higueras	(United States) E. Dibbs
1980 (Note: The official ATP year-end rankings were listed from 4 January 1981.)	(Sweden) B. Borg	(United States) J. McEnroe	(United States) J. Connors	(United States) G. Mayer^{★}	(Argentina) G. Vilas	(Czechoslovakia) I. Lendl	(United States) H. Solomon^{★}	(Argentina) JL. Clerc	(United States) V. Gerulaitis	(United States) E. Teltscher
1981 (Note: The official ATP year-end rankings were listed from 4 January 1982.)	(United States) J. McEnroe^{★}	(Czechoslovakia) I. Lendl	(United States) J. Connors	(Sweden) B. Borg	(Argentina) JL. Clerc^{★}	(Argentina) G. Vilas	(United States) G. Mayer	(United States) E. Teltscher^{★}	(United States) V. Gerulaitis	(Australia) P. McNamara^{★}
1982 (Note: The official ATP year-end rankings were listed from 3 January 1983.)	(United States) J. McEnroe	(United States) J. Connors	(Czechoslovakia) I. Lendl	(Argentina) G. Vilas	(United States) V. Gerulaitis	(Argentina) JL. Clerc	(Sweden) M. Wilander	(United States) G. Mayer	(France) Y. Noah	(Australia) P. McNamara
1983 (Note: The official ATP year-end rankings were listed from 2 January 1984.)	(United States) J. McEnroe	(Czechoslovakia) I. Lendl	(United States) J. Connors	(Sweden) M. Wilander	(France) Y. Noah	(United States) J. Arias^{★}	(Spain) J. Higueras^{★}	(Argentina) JL. Clerc	(South Africa) K. Curren^{★}	(United States) G. Mayer^{★}
1984 (Note: The official ATP year-end rankings were listed from 2 January 1985.)	(United States) J. McEnroe	(United States) J. Connors	(Czechoslovakia) I. Lendl	(Sweden) M. Wilander	(Ecuador) A. Gómez^{★}	(Sweden) A. Järryd^{★}	(Sweden) H. Sundström^{★}	(Australia) P. Cash	(United States) E. Teltscher	(France) Y. Noah
1985	(Czechoslovakia) I. Lendl^{★}	(United States) J. McEnroe	(Sweden) M. Wilander	(United States) J. Connors	(Sweden) S. Edberg	(West Germany) B. Becker	(France) Y. Noah	(Sweden) A. Järryd	(Czechoslovakia) M. Mečíř	(United States) K. Curren (Note: Kevin Curren became a naturalized American citizen in 1985 after representing South Africa.)
1986	(Czechoslovakia) I. Lendl	(West Germany) B. Becker^{★}	(Sweden) M. Wilander	(France) Y. Noah^{★}	(Sweden) S. Edberg	(France) H. Leconte^{★}	(Sweden) J. Nyström^{★}	(United States) J. Connors	(Czechoslovakia) M. Mečíř	(Ecuador) A. Gómez
1987	(Czechoslovakia) I. Lendl	(Sweden) S. Edberg	(Sweden) M. Wilander	(United States) J. Connors	(West Germany) B. Becker	(Czechoslovakia) M. Mečíř^{★}	(Australia) P. Cash^{★}	(France) Y. Noah	(United States) T. Mayotte^{★}	(United States) J. McEnroe
1988	(Sweden) M. Wilander^{★}	(Czechoslovakia) I. Lendl	(United States) A. Agassi	(West Germany) B. Becker	(Sweden) S. Edberg	(Sweden) K. Carlsson^{★}	(United States) J. Connors	(Switzerland) J. Hlasek^{★}	(France) H. Leconte	(United States) T. Mayotte
1989	(Czechoslovakia) I. Lendl	(West Germany) B. Becker	(Sweden) S. Edberg	(United States) J. McEnroe	(United States) M. Chang	(United States) B. Gilbert^{★}	(United States) A. Agassi	(United States) A. Krickstein^{★}	(Argentina) A. Mancini^{★}	(United States) J. Berger^{★}
1990	(Sweden) S. Edberg^{★}	(Germany) B. Becker	(Czechoslovakia) I. Lendl	(United States) A. Agassi	(United States) P. Sampras	(Ecuador) A. Gómez	(Austria) T. Muster	(Spain) E. Sánchez^{★}	(Socialist Federal Republic of Yugoslavia) G. Ivanišević	(United States) B. Gilbert
1991	(Sweden) S. Edberg	(United States) J. Courier	(Germany) B. Becker	(Germany) M. Stich	(Czechoslovakia) I. Lendl	(United States) P. Sampras	(France) G. Forget^{★}	(Czechoslovakia) K. Nováček^{★}	(Czechoslovakia) P. Korda	(United States) A. Agassi
1992	(United States) J. Courier^{★}	(Sweden) S. Edberg	(United States) P. Sampras	(Croatia) G. Ivanišević^{★}	(Germany) B. Becker	(United States) M. Chang	(Czechoslovakia) P. Korda^{★}	(United States) I. Lendl (Note: Ivan Lendl became a naturalized American citizen in 1992 after representing Czechoslovakia.)	(United States) A. Agassi	(Netherlands) R. Krajicek
1993	(United States) P. Sampras^{★}	(Germany) M. Stich^{★}	(United States) J. Courier	(Spain) S. Bruguera^{★}	(Sweden) S. Edberg	(Ukraine) A. Medvedev^{★}	(Croatia) G. Ivanišević	(United States) M. Chang	(Austria) T. Muster	(France) C. Pioline^{★}
1994	(United States) P. Sampras	(United States) A. Agassi	(Germany) B. Becker	(Spain) S. Bruguera	(Croatia) G. Ivanišević	(United States) M. Chang	(Sweden) S. Edberg	(Spain) A. Berasategui^{★}	(Germany) M. Stich	(United States) T. Martin
1995	(United States) P. Sampras	(United States) A. Agassi	(Austria) T. Muster^{★}	(Germany) B. Becker	(United States) M. Chang	(Russia) Y. Kafelnikov	(Sweden) T. Enqvist	(United States) J. Courier	(South Africa) W. Ferreira^{★}	(Croatia) G. Ivanišević
1996	(United States) P. Sampras	(United States) M. Chang^{★}	(Russia) Y. Kafelnikov	(Croatia) G. Ivanišević	(Austria) T. Muster	(Germany) B. Becker	(Netherlands) R. Krajicek^{★}	(United States) A. Agassi	(Sweden) T. Enqvist	(South Africa) W. Ferreira
1997	(United States) P. Sampras	(Australia) P. Rafter^{★}	(United States) M. Chang	(Sweden) J. Björkman^{★}	(Russia) Y. Kafelnikov	(United Kingdom) G. Rusedski^{★}	(Spain) C. Moya	(Spain) S. Bruguera	(Austria) T. Muster	(Chile) M. Ríos
1998	(United States) P. Sampras	(Chile) M. Ríos^{★}	(Spain) À. Corretja^{★}	(Australia) P. Rafter	(Spain) C. Moyá^{★}	(United States) A. Agassi	(United Kingdom) T. Henman	(Slovakia) K. Kučera^{★}	(United Kingdom) G. Rusedski	(Netherlands) R. Krajicek
1999	(United States) A. Agassi^{★}	(Russia) Y. Kafelnikov^{★}	(United States) P. Sampras	(Sweden) T. Enqvist^{★}	(Brazil) G. Kuerten	(Germany) N. Kiefer^{★}	(United States) T. Martin^{★}	(Ecuador) N. Lapentti^{★}	(Chile) M. Ríos	(Netherlands) R. Krajicek
2000	(Brazil) G. Kuerten^{★}	(Russia) M. Safin^{★}	(United States) P. Sampras	(Sweden) M. Norman^{★}	(Russia) Y. Kafelnikov	(United States) A. Agassi	(Australia) L. Hewitt	(Spain) A. Corretja	(Sweden) T. Enqvist	(United Kingdom) T. Henman
2001	(Australia) L. Hewitt^{★}	(Brazil) G. Kuerten	(United States) A. Agassi	(Russia) Y. Kafelnikov	(Spain) JC. Ferrero	(France) S. Grosjean^{★}	(Australia) P. Rafter	(Germany) T. Haas^{★}	(United Kingdom) T. Henman	(United States) P. Sampras
2002	(Australia) L. Hewitt	(United States) A. Agassi	(Russia) M. Safin	(Spain) JC. Ferrero	(Spain) C. Moya	(Switzerland) R. Federer	(Czech Republic) J. Novák^{★}	(United Kingdom) T. Henman	(Spain) A. Costa^{★}	(United States) A. Roddick
2003	(United States) A. Roddick^{★}	(Switzerland) R. Federer	(Spain) JC. Ferrero^{★}	(United States) A. Agassi	(Argentina) G. Coria^{★}	(Germany) R. Schüttler^{★}	(Spain) C. Moyá	(Argentina) D. Nalbandian	(Australia) M. Philippoussis^{★}	(France) S. Grosjean
2004	(Switzerland) R. Federer^{★}	(United States) A. Roddick	(Australia) L. Hewitt	(Russia) M. Safin	(Spain) C. Moyá	(United Kingdom) T. Henman^{★}	(Argentina) G. Coria	(United States) A. Agassi	(Argentina) D. Nalbandian	(Argentina) G. Gaudio^{★}
2005	(Switzerland) R. Federer	(Spain) R. Nadal	(United States) A. Roddick	(Australia) L. Hewitt	(Russia) N. Davydenko	(Argentina) D. Nalbandian^{★}	(United States) A. Agassi	(Argentina) G. Coria	(Croatia) I. Ljubičić	(Argentina) G. Gaudio
2006	(Switzerland) R. Federer	(Spain) R. Nadal	(Russia) N. Davydenko^{★}	(United States) J. Blake^{★}	(Croatia) I. Ljubičić^{★}	(United States) A. Roddick	(Spain) T. Robredo^{★}	(Argentina) D. Nalbandian	(Croatia) M. Ančić^{★}	(Chile) F. González
2007	(Switzerland) R. Federer	(Spain) R. Nadal	(Serbia) N. Djokovic	(Russia) N. Davydenko	(Spain) D. Ferrer	(United States) A. Roddick	(Chile) F. González^{★}	(France) R. Gasquet^{★}	(Argentina) D. Nalbandian	(Spain) T. Robredo
2008	(Spain) R. Nadal^{★}	(Switzerland) R. Federer	(Serbia) N. Djokovic	(United Kingdom) A. Murray	(Russia) N. Davydenko	(France) JW. Tsonga^{★}	(France) G. Simon^{★}	(United States) A. Roddick	(Argentina) JM. del Potro	(United States) J. Blake
2009	(Switzerland) R. Federer	(Spain) R. Nadal	(Serbia) N. Djokovic	(United Kingdom) A. Murray	(Argentina) JM. del Potro^{★}	(Russia) N. Davydenko	(United States) A. Roddick	(Sweden) R. Söderling	(Spain) F. Verdasco^{★}	(France) JW. Tsonga
2010	(Spain) R. Nadal	(Switzerland) R. Federer	(Serbia) N. Djokovic	(United Kingdom) A. Murray	(Sweden) R. Söderling^{★}	(Czech Republic) T. Berdych^{★}	(Spain) D. Ferrer	(United States) A. Roddick	(Spain) F. Verdasco	(Russia) M. Youzhny^{★}
2011	(Serbia) N. Djokovic^{★}	(Spain) R. Nadal	(Switzerland) R. Federer	(United Kingdom) A. Murray	(Spain) D. Ferrer	(France) JW. Tsonga	(Czech Republic) T. Berdych	(United States) M. Fish^{★}	(Serbia) J. Tipsarević^{★}	(Spain) N. Almagro^{★}
2012	(Serbia) N. Djokovic	(Switzerland) R. Federer	(United Kingdom) A. Murray	(Spain) R. Nadal	(Spain) D. Ferrer	(Czech Republic) T. Berdych	(Argentina) JM. del Potro	(France) JW. Tsonga	(Serbia) J. Tipsarević	(France) R. Gasquet
2013	(Spain) R. Nadal	(Serbia) N. Djokovic	(Spain) D. Ferrer^{★}	(United Kingdom) A. Murray	(Argentina) JM. del Potro	(Switzerland) R. Federer	(Czech Republic) T. Berdych	(Switzerland) S. Wawrinka	(France) R. Gasquet	(France) JW. Tsonga
2014	(Serbia) N. Djokovic	(Switzerland) R. Federer	(Spain) R. Nadal	(Switzerland) S. Wawrinka^{★}	(Japan) K. Nishikori^{★}	(United Kingdom) A. Murray	(Czech Republic) T. Berdych	(Canada) M. Raonic	(Croatia) M. Čilić	(Spain) D. Ferrer
2015	(Serbia) N. Djokovic	(United Kingdom) A. Murray	(Switzerland) R. Federer	(Switzerland) S. Wawrinka	(Spain) R. Nadal	(Czech Republic) T. Berdych	(Spain) D. Ferrer	(Japan) K. Nishikori	(France) R. Gasquet	(France) JW. Tsonga
2016	(United Kingdom) A. Murray^{★}	(Serbia) N. Djokovic	(Canada) M. Raonic^{★}	(Switzerland) S. Wawrinka	(Japan) K. Nishikori	(Croatia) M. Čilić^{★}	(France) G. Monfils^{★}	(Austria) D. Thiem	(Spain) R. Nadal	(Czech Republic) T. Berdych
2017	(Spain) R. Nadal	(Switzerland) R. Federer	(Bulgaria) G. Dimitrov^{★}	(Germany) A. Zverev	(Austria) D. Thiem	(Croatia) M. Čilić	(Belgium) D. Goffin^{★}	(United States) J. Sock^{★}	(Switzerland) S. Wawrinka	(Spain) P. Carreño Busta^{★}
2018	(Serbia) N. Djokovic	(Spain) R. Nadal	(Switzerland) R. Federer	(Germany) A. Zverev	(Argentina) JM. del Potro	(South Africa) K. Anderson^{★}	(Croatia) M. Čilić	(Austria) D. Thiem	(Japan) K. Nishikori	(United States) J. Isner^{★}
2019	(Spain) R. Nadal	(Serbia) N. Djokovic	(Switzerland) R. Federer	(Austria) D. Thiem	(Russia) D. Medvedev	(Greece) S. Tsitsipas	(Germany) A. Zverev	(Italy) M. Berrettini	(Spain) R. Bautista Agut^{★}	(France) G. Monfils
2020	(Serbia) N. Djokovic	(Spain) R. Nadal	(Austria) D. Thiem^{★}	(Russia) D. Medvedev	(Switzerland) R. Federer	(Greece) S. Tsitsipas	(Germany) A. Zverev	(Russia) A. Rublev	(Argentina) D. Schwartzman^{★}	(Italy) M. Berrettini
2021	(Serbia) N. Djokovic	(Russia) D. Medvedev^{★}	(Germany) A. Zverev	(Greece) S. Tsitsipas^{★}	(Russia) A. Rublev^{★}	(Spain) R. Nadal	(Italy) M. Berrettini^{★}	(Norway) C. Ruud	(Poland) H. Hurkacz^{★}	(Italy) J. Sinner
2022	(Spain) C. Alcaraz^{★}	(Spain) R. Nadal	(Norway) C. Ruud^{★}	(Greece) S. Tsitsipas	(Serbia) N. Djokovic	(Canada) F. Auger-Aliassime	(Russia) D. Medvedev	(Russia) A. Rublev	(United States) T. Fritz	(Poland) H. Hurkacz
2023	(Serbia) N. Djokovic	(Spain) C. Alcaraz	(Russia) D. Medvedev	(Italy) J. Sinner	(Russia) A. Rublev	(Greece) S. Tsitsipas	(Germany) A. Zverev	(Denmark) H. Rune^{★}	(Poland) H. Hurkacz	(United States) T. Fritz
2024	(Italy) J. Sinner^{★}	(Germany) A. Zverev	(Spain) C. Alcaraz	(United States) T. Fritz^{★}	(Russia) D. Medvedev	(Norway) C. Ruud	(Serbia) N. Djokovic	(Russia) A. Rublev	(Australia) A. de Minaur	(Bulgaria) G. Dimitrov
2025	(Spain) C. Alcaraz	(Italy) J. Sinner	(Germany) A. Zverev	(Serbia) N. Djokovic	(Canada) F. Auger-Aliassime^{★}	(United States) T. Fritz	(Australia) A. de Minaur^{★}	(Italy) L. Musetti^{★}	(United States) B. Shelton	(United Kingdom) J. Draper^{★}
2026	(Germany) A. Zverev^{★}	(Italy) J. Sinner	(Spain) C. Alcaraz	(United States) B. Shelton^{★}	(Russia) D. Medvedev	(France) A. Fils^{★}	(Italy) F. Cobolli^{★}	(United States) F. Tiafoe^{★}	(United States) T. Fritz	(Spain) R. Jódar^{★}

== ATP rankings achievements ==
=== Total weeks ===
As of 4 January 2027, with currently-ranked players in boldface

#	No. 1
428	(Serbia) **Novak Djokovic**
310	(Switzerland) Roger Federer
286	(United States) Pete Sampras
270	(Czechoslovakia) Ivan Lendl
268	(United States) Jimmy Connors

#	Top 2
599	(Serbia) **Novak Djokovic**
596	(Spain) Rafael Nadal
528	(Switzerland) Roger Federer
387	(United States) Jimmy Connors
376	(Czechoslovakia) Ivan Lendl

#	Top 3
764	(Serbia) **Novak Djokovic**
750	(Switzerland) Roger Federer
686	(Spain) Rafael Nadal
592	(United States) Jimmy Connors
499	(Czechoslovakia) Ivan Lendl

#	Top 4
829	(Serbia) **Novak Djokovic**
804	(Switzerland) Roger Federer
756	(Spain) Rafael Nadal
669	(United States) Jimmy Connors
540	(Czechoslovakia) Ivan Lendl

#	Top 5
873	(Serbia) **Novak Djokovic**
859	(Switzerland) Roger Federer
837	(Spain) Rafael Nadal
705	(United States) Jimmy Connors
563	(Czechoslovakia) Ivan Lendl

#	Top 10
968	(Switzerland) Roger Federer
961	(Serbia) **Novak Djokovic**
912	(Spain) Rafael Nadal
817	(United States) Jimmy Connors
747	(United States) Andre Agassi

#	Top 100
1167	(Switzerland) Roger Federer
1100	(Serbia) **Novak Djokovic**
1029	(Spain) Rafael Nadal
1019	(United States) Andre Agassi
1006	(France) Gaël Monfils

=== Year-end rankings ===
As of the end of 2025, with active players in boldface

#	No. 1
8	(Serbia) **Novak Djokovic**
6	(United States) Pete Sampras
5	(United States) Jimmy Connors
5	(Switzerland) Roger Federer
5	(Spain) Rafael Nadal
4	(United States) John McEnroe
4	(Czechoslovakia) Ivan Lendl

#	Top 2
13	(Spain) Rafael Nadal
11	(Switzerland) Roger Federer
11	(Serbia) **Novak Djokovic**
8	(United States) Jimmy Connors
6	(United States) John McEnroe
6	(Czechoslovakia) Ivan Lendl
6	(United States) Pete Sampras

#	Top 3
15	(Switzerland) Roger Federer
15	(Serbia) **Novak Djokovic**
14	(Spain) Rafael Nadal
12	(United States) Jimmy Connors
10	(Czechoslovakia) Ivan Lendl

#	Top 4
16	(Serbia) **Novak Djokovic**
15	(Switzerland) Roger Federer
15	(Spain) Rafael Nadal
14	(United States) Jimmy Connors
10	(Czechoslovakia) Ivan Lendl

#	Top 5
17	(Serbia) **Novak Djokovic**
16	(Switzerland) Roger Federer
16	(Spain) Rafael Nadal
14	(United States) Jimmy Connors
11	(Czechoslovakia) Ivan Lendl

#	Top 10
18	(Switzerland) Roger Federer
18	(Spain) Rafael Nadal
18	(Serbia) **Novak Djokovic**
16	(United States) Jimmy Connors
16	(United States) Andre Agassi

== ATP No. 1 in singles and doubles ==
Players who were ranked No. 1 in both singles and doubles at any time in their careers.

Player	Singles			Doubles		
Player	First held	Last held	Weeks	First held	Last held	Weeks
(United States) John McEnroe	3 Mar 1980	8 Sep 1985	170	23 Apr 1979	24 Sep 1989	269
(Sweden) Stefan Edberg	13 Aug 1990	4 Oct 1992	72	9 Jun 1986	22 Feb 1987	15

- McEnroe was ranked No. 1 in singles and No. 1 in doubles simultaneously for 121 weeks, which included the week of 3 March 1980, when McEnroe would become just the 5th new singles world No.1 player.
- McEnroe finished as the year-end No. 1 in both singles and doubles for 3 years: 1981, 1982, and 1983.

== ATP No. 1 ranked doubles players ==
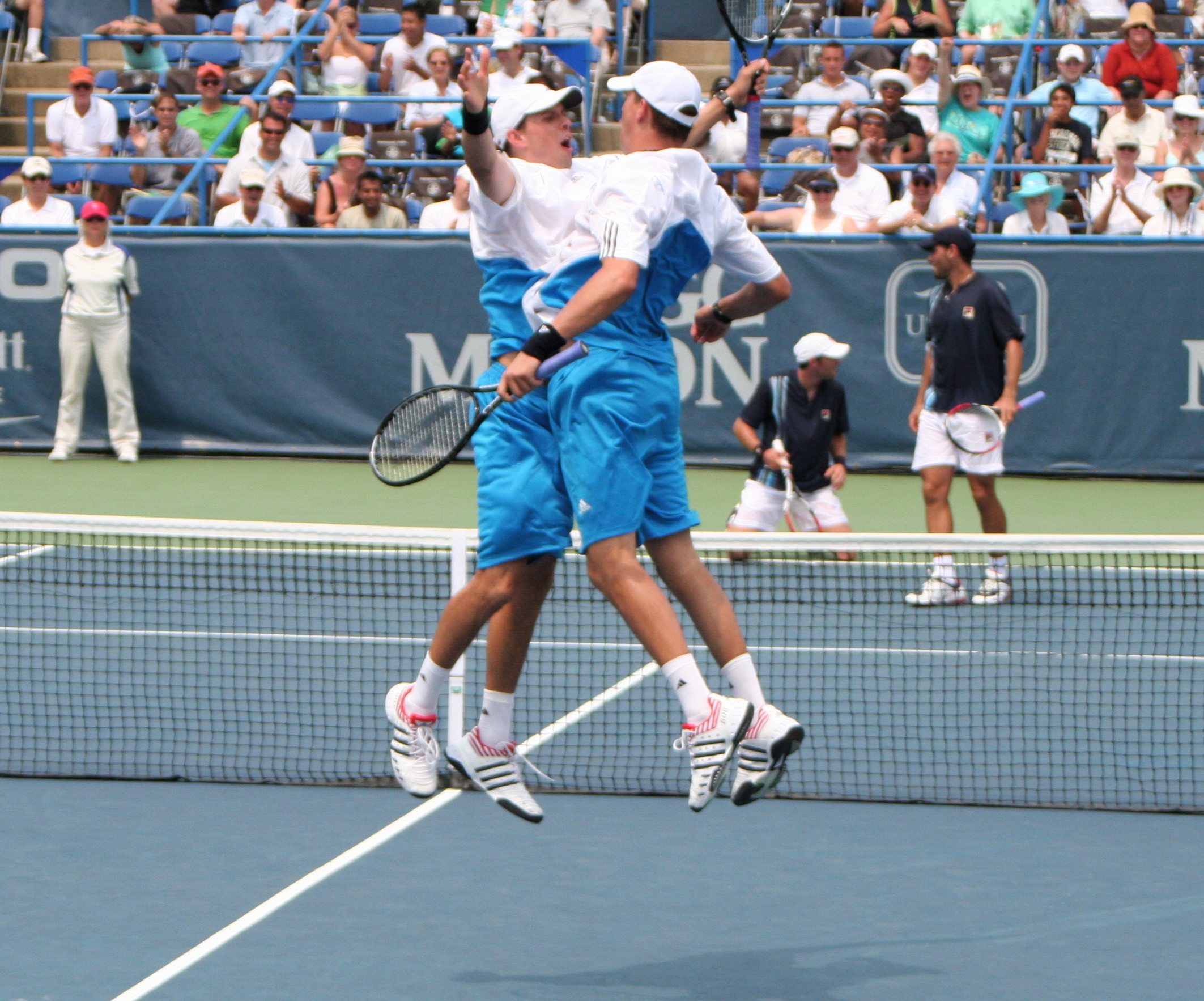
Mike and Bob Bryan, the most successful doubles No. 1 players.

Current world No. 1 as of 23 November 2026.
Active former No. 1 players.

Weeks	No. 1 player
506	(United States) Mike Bryan
439	(United States) Bob Bryan
269	(United States) John McEnroe
205	(Australia) Todd Woodbridge
108	(Canada) Daniel Nestor
107	(Sweden) Anders Järryd
97	(Croatia) Mate Pavić
85	(South Africa) Frew McMillan
83	(Australia) Mark Woodforde
74	(Sweden) Jonas Björkman
70	(Netherlands) Paul Haarhuis
68	(Colombia) Robert Farah
65	(The Bahamas) Mark Knowles
62	(Mexico) Raúl Ramírez
62	(United States) Robert Seguso
62	(Netherlands) Jacco Eltingh
57	(Belarus) Max Mirnyi
56	(Brazil) Marcelo Melo
50	(United Kingdom) Neal Skupski
43	(Serbia) Nenad Zimonjić
40	(Australia) John Fitzgerald
40	(El Salvador) Marcelo Arévalo
39	(India) Leander Paes
39	(France) Nicolas Mahut
34	(Czechoslovakia) Tomáš Šmíd
34	(Netherlands) Wesley Koolhof
29	(Colombia) Juan Sebastián Cabal
27	(South Africa) Danie Visser
26	(United States) Jim Pugh
26	(Finland) Henri Kontinen
26	(United Kingdom) Joe Salisbury
26	(United States) Austin Krajicek
25	(United States) David Pate
25	(Argentina) Horacio Zeballos
25	(Finland) Harri Heliövaara
25	(United Kingdom) Henry Patten
24	(United Kingdom) Lloyd Glasspool
22	(Spain) Marcel Granollers
20	(United States) Donald Johnson
19	(France) Yannick Noah
19	(South Africa) Pieter Aldrich
19	(Poland) Łukasz Kubot
17	(United States) Peter Fleming
17	(United States) Jared Palmer
17	(Canada) Grant Connell
15	(Sweden) Stefan Edberg
13	(Ecuador) Andrés Gómez
13	(United States) Jim Grabb
13	(United States) Richey Reneberg
11	(Netherlands) Tom Okker
9	(United States) Rick Leach
9	(United Kingdom) Jamie Murray
9	(United States) Rajeev Ram
9	(Australia) Matthew Ebden
8	(United States) Stan Smith
8	(Zimbabwe) Byron Black
8	(India) Rohan Bopanna
7	(Socialist Federal Republic of Yugoslavia) Slobodan Živojinović
6	(South Africa) Bob Hewitt
6	(Spain) Emilio Sánchez
6	(United States) Jonathan Stark
5	(United States) Ken Flach
5	(United States) Alex O'Brien
4	(United States) Patrick Galbraith
4	(India) Mahesh Bhupathi
3	(Australia) Paul McNamee
3	(Croatia) Nikola Mektić
1	(United States) Kelly Jones
68 doubles players

Year-end No. 1
10	(United States) Mike Bryan
8	(United States) Bob Bryan
5	(United States) John McEnroe
3	(Australia) Mark Woodforde
3	(Australia) Todd Woodbridge
2	(South Africa) Frew McMillan
2	(United States) Robert Seguso
2	(Sweden) Anders Järryd
2	(The Bahamas) Mark Knowles
2	(Brazil) Marcelo Melo
2	(Colombia) Robert Farah
2	(Croatia) Mate Pavić
1	(Mexico) Raúl Ramírez
1	(Czechoslovakia) Tomáš Šmíd
1	(Ecuador) Andrés Gómez
1	(South Africa) Pieter Aldrich
1	(South Africa) Danie Visser
1	(Australia) John Fitzgerald
1	(Canada) Grant Connell
1	(Netherlands) Paul Haarhuis
1	(Netherlands) Jacco Eltingh
1	(India) Leander Paes
1	(Sweden) Jonas Björkman
1	(Belarus) Max Mirnyi
1	(Canada) Daniel Nestor
1	(Serbia) Nenad Zimonjić
1	(France) Nicolas Mahut
1	(Colombia) Juan Sebastián Cabal
1	(Netherlands) Wesley Koolhof
1	(United Kingdom) Neal Skupski
1	(United States) Austin Krajicek
1	(El Salvador) Marcelo Arévalo
32 players

== See also ==
- List of ATP number 1 ranked singles tennis players
- List of ATP number 1 ranked doubles tennis players
- World number 1 ranked male tennis players
- Top ten ranked male tennis players
- Top ten ranked male tennis players (1912–1972)
- ITF World Champions
- List of highest ranked tennis players per country
- WTA rankings
- Current tennis rankings
