= CTrader =

Electronic trading platform

cTrader
- Type: Private
- Industry: Finance
- Founded: 2011
- Headquarters: Limassol, Cyprus
- Website: ctrader.com

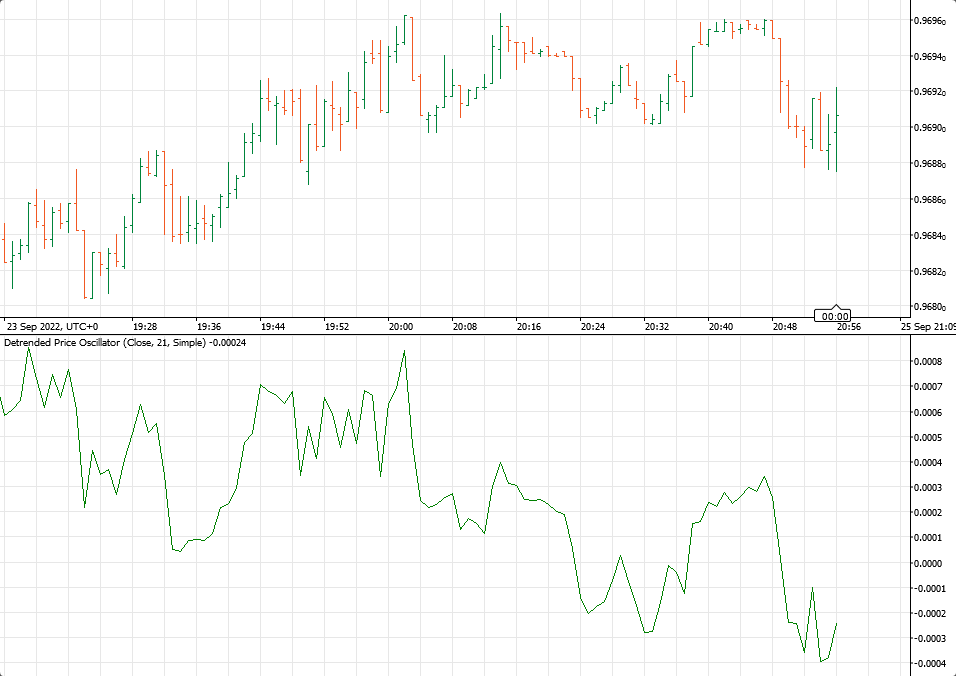
An example of the detrended price oscillator in the cTrader trading platform

cTrader is an electronic trading platform that provides access to trading contracts for difference (CFDs), as well as currency pairs. cTrader is developed by Spotware Systems, a company based in Limassol, Cyprus.

== History ==
Spotware Systems launched cTrader in 2011. In November 2011, the company launched cAlgo, a companion application for algorithmic trading that later became cTrader Algo.

In 2018, Spotware introduced cTrader Copy, a built-in copy-trading service that replaced the earlier cMirror product.

The cTrader Store was launched in December 2025. Python support was also added for cTrader Algo in August 2025.

In early 2026, Spotware Systems restricted US-based proprietary trading firms from offering cTrader to their customers due to regulatory issues.

== Overview ==
cTrader provides trading, charting, copy trading, and algo trading. It has desktop, web, and mobile interfaces.

cTrader allows retail traders access to margin-based trading in CFDs on forex, commodity futures, indexes, individual stocks, and cryptocurrencies.

cTrader is offered by retail brokers and prop trading firms (such as IC Markets, Pepperstone, and FxPro).

== Functions ==
cTrader Algo is a built-in algorithmic trading environment (formerly Automate) for building trading robots (cBots) and custom indicators in C# and Python using the platform’s API, with backtesting and optimisation tools.

cTrader Copy is a built-in social trading platform that lets investors allocate funds to strategies provided by other traders. The system uses an equity-to-equity copying model and supports performance, management, and volume fees.

cTrader Store is a marketplace for cBots, indicators, plugins, and copy strategies.

cTrader AI Agent Connect is a combination of two MCP servers that allows users to connect their AI agents to their cTrader accounts.

== See also ==
- List of electronic trading platforms
