= Single pushout graph rewriting =

Graph rewriting framework

In computer science, a single pushout graph rewriting or SPO graph rewriting refers to a mathematical framework for graph rewriting, and is used in contrast to the double-pushout approach of graph rewriting.
