= C-sharp =

C-sharp, C♯, or C# may refer to:

- C♯ (musical note)
  - C-sharp major, a musical scale
  - C-sharp minor, a musical scale
- C# (programming language), a programming language pronounced as "C-sharp"
