= Dual (category theory) =

Correspondence between properties of a category and its opposite

In category theory, a branch of mathematics, duality is a correspondence between the properties of a category C and the dual properties of the opposite category C^{op}. Given a statement regarding the category C, by interchanging the source and target of each morphism as well as interchanging the order of composing two morphisms, a corresponding dual statement is obtained regarding the opposite category C^{op}. (C^{op} is composed by reversing every morphism of C.) Duality, as such, is the assertion that truth is invariant under this operation on statements. In other words, if a statement S is true about C, then its dual statement is true about C^{op}. Also, if a statement is false about C, then its dual has to be false about C^{op}. (Compactly saying, S for C is true if and only if its dual for C^{op} is true.)

Given a concrete category C, it is often the case that the opposite category C^{op} per se is abstract. C^{op} need not be a category that arises from mathematical practice. In this case, another category D is also termed to be in duality with C if D and C^{op} are equivalent as categories.

In the case when C and its opposite C^{op} are equivalent, such a category is self-dual.

== Formal definition ==
We define the elementary language of category theory as the two-sorted first order language with objects and morphisms as distinct sorts, together with the relations of an object being the source or target of a morphism and a symbol for composing two morphisms.

Let σ be any statement in this language. We form the dual σ^{op} as follows:

1. Interchange each occurrence of "source" in σ with "target".
2. Interchange the order of composing morphisms. That is, replace each occurrence of $g \circ f$ with $f \circ g$

Informally, these conditions state that the dual of a statement is formed by reversing arrows and compositions.

Duality is the observation that σ is true for some category C if and only if σ^{op} is true for C^{op}.

== Examples ==
- A morphism $f\colon A \to B$ is a monomorphism if $f \circ g = f \circ h$ implies $g=h$. Performing the dual operation, we get the statement that $g \circ f = h \circ f$ implies $g=h.$ This reversed morphism $f\colon B \to A$ is by definition precisely an epimorphism. In short, the property of being a monomorphism is dual to the property of being an epimorphism.

Applying duality, this means that a morphism in some category C is a monomorphism if and only if the reverse morphism in the opposite category C^{op} (composed by reversing all morphisms in C) is an epimorphism.

- An example comes from reversing the direction of inequalities in a partial order. So, if X is a set and ≤ a partial order relation, we can define a new partial order relation ≤_{new} by

x ≤_{new} y if and only if y ≤ x.

This example on orders is a special case, since partial orders correspond to a certain kind of category in which Hom(A,B) (a set of all morphisms from A to B of a category) can have at most one element. In applications to logic, this then looks like a very general description of negation (that is, proofs run in the opposite direction). For example, if we take the opposite of a lattice, we will find that meets and joins have their roles interchanged. This is an abstract form of De Morgan's laws, or of duality applied to lattices.

- Limits and colimits are dual notions.
- Fibrations and cofibrations are examples of dual notions in algebraic topology and homotopy theory. In this context, the duality is often called Eckmann–Hilton duality.

== See also ==
- Adjoint functor
- Dual object
- Duality (mathematics)
- Opposite category
- Pulation square
