= Span (category theory) =

Generalization of a notion in category theory

In category theory, a span, roof or correspondence is a generalization of the notion of relation between two objects of a category. When the category has all pullbacks (and satisfies a small number of other conditions), spans can be considered as morphisms in a category of fractions.

The notion of a span is due to Nobuo Yoneda (1954) and Jean Bénabou (1967).

== Formal definition ==
A span is a diagram of type $\Lambda = (-1 \leftarrow 0 \rightarrow +1),$ i.e., a diagram of the form $Y \leftarrow X \rightarrow Z$.

That is, let Λ be the category (-1 ← 0 → +1). Then a span in a category C is a functor S : Λ → C. This means that a span consists of three objects X, Y and Z of C and morphisms f : X → Y and g : X → Z: it is two maps with common domain.

The colimit of a span is a pushout.

== Examples ==
- If R is a relation between sets X and Y (i.e. a subset of X × Y), then X ← R → Y is a span, where the maps are the projection maps $X \times Y \overset{\pi_X}{\to} X$ and $X \times Y \overset{\pi_Y}{\to} Y$.
- Any object yields the trivial span A ← A → A, where the maps are the identity.
- More generally, let $\phi\colon A \to B$ be a morphism in some category. There is a trivial span A ← A → B, where the left map is the identity on A, and the right map is the given map φ.
- If M is a model category, with W the set of weak equivalences, then the spans of the form $X \leftarrow Y \rightarrow Z,$ where the left morphism is in W, can be considered a generalised morphism (i.e., where one "inverts the weak equivalences"). Note that this is not the usual point of view taken when dealing with model categories.

== Cospans ==
A cospan K in a category C is a functor K : Λ^{op} → C; equivalently, a contravariant functor from Λ to C. That is, a diagram of type $\Lambda^\text{op} = (-1 \rightarrow 0 \leftarrow +1),$ i.e., a diagram of the form $Y \rightarrow X \leftarrow Z$.

Thus it consists of three objects X, Y and Z of C and morphisms f : Y → X and g : Z → X: it is two maps with common codomain.

The limit of a cospan is a pullback.

An example of a cospan is a cobordism W between two manifolds M and N, where the two maps are the inclusions into W. Note that while cobordisms are cospans, the category of cobordisms is not a "cospan category": it is not the category of all cospans in "the category of manifolds with inclusions on the boundary", but rather a subcategory thereof, as the requirement that M and N form a partition of the boundary of W is a global constraint.

The category nCob of finite-dimensional cobordisms is a dagger compact category. More generally, the category Span(C) of spans on any category C with finite limits is also dagger compact.

== See also ==
- Binary relation
- Pullback (category theory)
- Pushout (category theory)
- Cobordism
