= Pushout (category theory) =

Most general completion of a commutative square given two morphisms with same domain

In category theory, a branch of mathematics, a pushout (also called a fibered coproduct or fibered sum or cocartesian square or amalgamated sum) is the colimit of a diagram consisting of two morphisms f : Z → X and g : Z → Y with a common domain. The pushout consists of an object P along with two morphisms X → P and Y → P that complete a commutative square with the two given morphisms f and g. In fact, the defining universal property of the pushout (given below) essentially says that the pushout is the "most general" way to complete this commutative square. Common notations for the pushout are $P = X \sqcup_Z Y$ and $P = X +_Z Y$.

The pushout is the categorical dual of the pullback.

== Universal property ==
Explicitly, the pushout of the morphisms f and g consists of an object P and two morphisms i_{1} : X → P and i_{2} : Y → P such that the diagram

commutes and such that (P, i_{1}, i_{2}) is universal with respect to this diagram. That is, for any other such triple (Q, j_{1}, j_{2}) for which the following diagram commutes, there must exist a unique u : P → Q also making the diagram commute:

As with all universal constructions, the pushout, if it exists, is unique up to a unique isomorphism.

== Examples of pushouts ==
Here are some examples of pushouts in familiar categories. Note that in each case, we are only providing a construction of an object in the isomorphism class of pushouts; as mentioned above, though there may be other ways to construct it, they are all equivalent.

- Suppose that X, Y, and Z as above are sets, and that f : Z → X and g : Z → Y are set functions. The pushout of f and g is the disjoint union of X and Y, where elements sharing a common preimage (in Z) are identified, together with the morphisms i_{1}, i_{2} from X and Y, i.e. $P = (X \sqcup Y)/\!\sim$ where ~ is the finest equivalence relation such that f(z) ~ g(z) for all z in Z. In particular, if X and Y are subsets of some larger set W and Z is their intersection, with f and g the inclusion maps of Z into X and Y, then the pushout can be canonically identified with the union $X \cup Y \subseteq W$.
  - A specific case of this is the cograph of a function. If $f \colon X \to Y$ is a function, then the cograph of a function is the pushout of f along the identity function of X. In elementary terms, the cograph is the quotient of $X \sqcup Y$ by the equivalence relation generated by identifying $x \in X \subseteq X \sqcup Y$ with $f(x) \in Y \subseteq X \sqcup Y$. A function may be recovered by its cograph because each equivalence class in $X \sqcup Y$ contains precisely one element of Y. Cographs are dual to graphs of functions since the graph may be defined as the pullback of f along the identity of Y.
- The construction of adjunction spaces is an example of pushouts in the category of topological spaces. More precisely, if Z is a subspace of Y and g : Z → Y is the inclusion map we can "glue" Y to another space X along Z using an "attaching map" f : Z → X. The result is the adjunction space $X \cup_{f} Y$, which is just the pushout of f and g. More generally, all identification spaces may be regarded as pushouts in this way.
- A special case of the above is the wedge sum or one-point union; here we take X and Y to be pointed spaces and Z the one-point space. Then the pushout is $X \vee Y$, the space obtained by gluing the basepoint of X to the basepoint of Y.
- In the category of abelian groups, pushouts can be thought of as "direct sum with gluing" in the same way we think of adjunction spaces as "disjoint union with gluing". The zero group is a subgroup of every group, so for any abelian groups A and B, we have homomorphisms $f : 0 \to A$ and $g : 0 \to B$. The pushout of these maps is the direct sum of A and B. Generalizing to the case where f and g are arbitrary homomorphisms from a common domain Z, one obtains for the pushout a quotient group of the direct sum; namely, we mod out by the subgroup consisting of pairs (f(z), −g(z)). Thus we have "glued" along the images of Z under f and g. A similar approach yields the pushout in the category of R-modules for any ring R.
- In the category of groups, the pushout is called the free product with amalgamation. It shows up in the Seifert–van Kampen theorem of algebraic topology (see below).
- In CRing, the category of commutative rings (a full subcategory of the category of rings), the pushout is given by the tensor product of rings $A \otimes_{C} B$ with the morphisms $g': A \rightarrow A \otimes_{C} B$ and $f': B \rightarrow A \otimes_{C} B$ that satisfy $f' \circ g = g' \circ f$. In fact, since the pushout is the colimit of a span and the pullback is the limit of a cospan, we can think of the tensor product of rings and the fibered product of rings (see the examples section) as dual notions to each other. In particular, let A, B, and C be objects (commutative rings with identity) in CRing and let f : C → A and g : C → B be morphisms (ring homomorphisms) in CRing. Then the tensor product is:

$$A \otimes_{C} B = \left\{\sum_{i \in I} (a_i,b_i) \; \big| \; a_i \in A, b_i \in B \right\} \Bigg/ \bigg\langle (f(c)a,b) - (a,g(c)b) \; \big| \; a \in A, b \in B, c \in C \bigg\rangle$$

- See Free product of associative algebras for the case of non-commutative rings.
- In the multiplicative monoid of positive integers $\mathbf{Z}_+$, considered as a category with one object, the pushout of two positive integers m and n is just the pair $\left(\frac{\operatorname{lcm}(m,n)}{m}, \frac{\operatorname{lcm}(m,n)}{n}\right)$, where the numerators are both the least common multiple of m and n. Note that the same pair is also the pullback.
- Let $f : X \to Y$ be a morphism in a category $\mathcal{C}$ (resp. ring homomorphism in a CRing) such that the pushout $Y \sqcup_{X} Y$ (resp. tensor product $i_1, i_2:Y \otimes_{X} Y$) exists, here two morphisms $i_1,i_2:Y \to Y \sqcup_{X} Y$ (resp. $i_1, i_2:Y \to Y \otimes_{X} Y$). The following statements are equivalent:

(i) $f$ is an epimorphism.

(ii) $i_1$ is an isomorphism (resp. ring isomorphism).

(iii) $i_2$ is an isomorphism (resp. ring isomorphism)

(iv) The codiagonal morphism $Y \sqcup_{X} Y \to Y$ is an isomorphism (resp. $Y \otimes_{X} Y \to Y$ is a ring isomorphism).

== Properties ==
- Whenever the pushout A ⊔_{C} B exists, then B ⊔_{C} A exists as well and there is a natural isomorphism A ⊔_{C} B ≅ B ⊔_{C} A.
- In an abelian category all pushouts exist, and they preserve cokernels in the following sense: if (P, i_{1}, i_{2}) is the pushout of f : Z → X and g : Z → Y, then the natural map coker(f) → coker(i_{2}) is an isomorphism, and so is the natural map coker(g) → coker(i_{1}).
- There is a natural isomorphism (A ⊔_{C} B) ⊔_{B} D ≅ A ⊔_{C} D. Explicitly, this means:
  - if maps f : C → A, g : C → B and h : B → D are given and
  - the pushout of f and g is given by i : A → P and j : B → P, and
  - the pushout of j and h is given by k : P → Q and l : D → Q,
  - then the pushout of f and hg is given by ki : A → Q and l : D → Q.

Graphically this means that two pushout squares, placed side by side and sharing one morphism, form a larger pushout square when ignoring the inner shared morphism.

== Construction via coproducts and coequalizers ==
Pushouts are equivalent to coproducts and coequalizers (if there is an initial object) in the sense that:

- Coproducts are a pushout from the initial object, and the coequalizer of f, g : X → Y is the pushout of [f, g] and [1_{X}, 1_{X}], so if there are pushouts (and an initial object), then there are coequalizers and coproducts;
- Pushouts can be constructed from coproducts and coequalizers, as described below (the pushout is the coequalizer of the maps to the coproduct).

All of the above examples may be regarded as special cases of the following very general construction, which works in any category C satisfying:

- For any objects A and B of C, their coproduct exists in C;
- For any morphisms j and k of C with the same domain and the same target, the coequalizer of j and k exists in C.

In this setup, we obtain the pushout of morphisms f : Z → X and g : Z → Y by first forming the coproduct of the targets X and Y. We then have two morphisms from Z to this coproduct. We can either go from Z to X via f, then include into the coproduct, or we can go from Z to Y via g, then include into the coproduct. The pushout of f and g is the coequalizer of these new maps.

== Application: the Seifert–van Kampen theorem ==
The Seifert–van Kampen theorem answers the following question. Suppose we have a path-connected space $X$, covered by path-connected open subspaces $A$ and $B$ whose intersection $A \cap B$ is also path-connected. (Assume also that the basepoint $\ast$ lies in the intersection of A and B.) If we know the fundamental groups of $A$, $B$ and $A\cap B$ can we recover the fundamental group of $X$? The answer is yes, provided we also know the induced homomorphisms $\pi_1(A \cap B,*) \to \pi_1(A,*)$ and $\pi_1(A \cap B,*) \to \pi_1(B,*).$ The theorem then says that the fundamental group of $X$ is the pushout of these two induced maps. Most obviously, $X$ is the pushout of the two inclusion maps of $A \cap B$ into $A$ and $B$. Thus we may interpret the theorem as confirming that the fundamental group functor preserves pushouts of inclusions. We might expect this to be simplest when $A \cap B$ is simply connected, since then both homomorphisms above have trivial domain. Indeed, this is the case, since then the pushout (of groups) reduces to the free product, which is the coproduct in the category of groups. In a most general case we will be speaking of a free product with amalgamation.

There is a detailed exposition of this, in a slightly more general setting (covering groupoids) in the book by J. P. May listed in the references.
