= Mitchell's embedding theorem =

Abelian categories, while abstractly defined, are in fact concrete categories of modules

Mitchell's embedding theorem, also known as the Freyd–Mitchell theorem or the full embedding theorem, is a result about small abelian categories; it states that these categories, while abstractly defined, can be represented as concrete categories whose objects are modules. In particular, the result allows one to use element-wise diagram chasing proofs in abelian categories. The theorem is named after Barry Mitchell and Peter Freyd.

== Details ==
The precise statement is as follows: if A is a small abelian category, then there exists a ring R (with 1, not necessarily commutative) and a full, faithful and exact functor F: A → R-Mod (where the latter denotes the category of all left R-modules).

The functor F yields an equivalence between A and a full subcategory of R-Mod in such a way that kernels and cokernels computed in A correspond to the ordinary kernels and cokernels computed in R-Mod. Such an equivalence is necessarily additive. The theorem thus essentially says that the objects of A can be thought of as R-modules, and the morphisms as R-linear maps, with kernels, cokernels, exact sequences and sums of morphisms being determined as in the case of modules. However, projective and injective objects in A do not necessarily correspond to projective and injective R-modules.

== Sketch of the proof ==
Let $\mathcal{L} \subset \operatorname{Fun}(\mathcal{A}, Ab)$ be the category of left exact functors from the abelian category $\mathcal{A}$ to the category of abelian groups $Ab$. First we construct a contravariant embedding $H:\mathcal{A}\to\mathcal{L}$ by $H(A) = h^A$ for all $A\in\mathcal{A}$, where $h^A$ is the covariant hom-functor, $h^A(X)=\operatorname{Hom}_\mathcal{A}(A,X)$. The Yoneda Lemma states that $H$ is fully faithful and we also get the left exactness of $H$ very easily because $h^A$ is already left exact. The proof of the right exactness of $H$ is harder and can be read in Swan, Lecture Notes in Mathematics 76.

After that we prove that $\mathcal{L}$ is an abelian category by using localization theory (also Swan). This is the hard part of the proof.

It is easy to check that the abelian category $\mathcal{L}$ is an AB5 category with a generator $\bigoplus_{A\in\mathcal{A}} h^A$. In other words it is a Grothendieck category and therefore has an injective cogenerator $I$.

The endomorphism ring $R := \operatorname{Hom}_{\mathcal{L}} (I,I)$ is the ring we need for the category of R-modules.

By $G(B) = \operatorname{Hom}_{\mathcal{L}} (B,I)$ we get another contravariant, exact and fully faithful embedding $G:\mathcal{L}\to R\operatorname{-Mod}.$ The composition $GH:\mathcal{A}\to R\operatorname{-Mod}$ is the desired covariant exact and fully faithful embedding.

Note that the proof of the Gabriel–Quillen embedding theorem for exact categories is almost identical.
