= Gabriel–Popescu theorem =

Mathematical theorem

In mathematics, the Gabriel–Popescu theorem is an embedding theorem for certain abelian categories, introduced by Pierre Gabriel and Nicolae Popescu (1964). It characterizes certain abelian categories (the Grothendieck categories) as quotients of module categories.

There are several generalizations and variations of the Gabriel–Popescu theorem, given by Kuhn (1994) (for an AB5 category with a set of generators), Lowen (2004), Porta (2010) (for triangulated categories).

== Theorem ==
Let A be a Grothendieck category (an AB5 category with a generator), G a generator of A and R be the ring of endomorphisms of G; also, let S be the functor from A to Mod-R (the category of right R-modules) defined by S(X) = Hom(G,X). Then the Gabriel–Popescu theorem states that S is full and faithful and has an exact left adjoint.

This implies that A is equivalent to the Serre quotient category of Mod-R by a certain localizing subcategory C. (A localizing subcategory of Mod-R is a full subcategory C of Mod-R, closed under arbitrary direct sums, such that for any short exact sequence of modules $0\rarr M_1\rarr M_2\rarr M_3\rarr 0$, we have M_{2} in C if and only if M_{1} and M_{3} are in C. The Serre quotient of Mod-R by any localizing subcategory is a Grothendieck category.) We may take C to be the kernel of the left adjoint of the functor S.

Note that the embedding S of A into Mod-R is left-exact but not necessarily right-exact: cokernels of morphisms in A do not in general correspond to the cokernels of the corresponding morphisms in Mod-R.
