= Grothendieck category =

Type of Abelian category (in category theory in mathematics)

In mathematics, a Grothendieck category is a certain kind of abelian category, introduced in Alexander Grothendieck's Tôhoku paper of 1957 in order to develop the machinery of homological algebra for modules and for sheaves in a unified manner. The theory of these categories was further developed in Pierre Gabriel's 1962 thesis.

To every algebraic variety $V$ one can associate a Grothendieck category $\operatorname{Qcoh}(V)$, consisting of the quasi-coherent sheaves on $V$. This category encodes all the relevant geometric information about $V$, and $V$ can be recovered from $\operatorname{Qcoh}(V)$ (the Gabriel–Rosenberg reconstruction theorem). This example gives rise to one approach to noncommutative algebraic geometry: the study of "non-commutative varieties" is then nothing but the study of (certain) Grothendieck categories.

== Definition ==
By definition, a Grothendieck category $\mathcal{A}$ is an AB5 category with a generator. Spelled out, this means that

- $\mathcal{A}$ is an abelian category;
- every (possibly infinite) family of objects in $\mathcal{A}$ has a coproduct (also known as direct sum) in $\mathcal{A}$;
- direct limits of short exact sequences are exact; this means that if a direct system of short exact sequences in $\mathcal{A}$ is given, then the induced sequence of direct limits is a short exact sequence as well. (Direct limits are always right-exact; the important point here is that we require them to be left-exact as well.)
- $\mathcal{A}$ possesses a generator, i.e. there is an object $G$ in $\mathcal{A}$ such that $\operatorname{Hom}(G,-)$ is a faithful functor from $\mathcal{A}$ to the category of sets. (In our situation, this is equivalent to saying that every object $X$ of $\mathcal{A}$ admits an epimorphism $G^{(I)}\rightarrow X$, where $G^{(I)}$ denotes a direct sum of copies of $G$, one for each element of the (possibly infinite) set $I$.)

The name "Grothendieck category" appeared neither in Grothendieck's Tôhoku paper nor in Gabriel's thesis; it came into use in the second half of the 1960s in the work of several authors, including Jan-Erik Roos, Bo Stenström, Ulrich Oberst, and Bodo Pareigis. (Some authors use a different definition, not requiring the existence of a generator.)

== Examples ==
- The prototypical example of a Grothendieck category is the category of abelian groups; the abelian group $\Z$ of integers is a generator.
- More generally, given any ring $R$ (associative, with $1$, but not necessarily commutative), the category $\operatorname{Mod}(R)$ of all right (or alternatively: left) modules over $R$ is a Grothendieck category; $R$ itself is a generator.
- Given a topological space $X$, the category of all sheaves of abelian groups on $X$ is a Grothendieck category. (More generally: the category of all sheaves of right $R$-modules on $X$ is a Grothendieck category for any ring $R$.)
- Given a ringed space $(X,\mathcal{O}_X)$, the category of sheaves of O_{X}-modules is a Grothendieck category.
- Given an (affine or projective) algebraic variety $V$ (or more generally: any scheme or algebraic stack), the category $\operatorname{Qcoh}(V)$ of quasi-coherent sheaves on $V$ is a Grothendieck category.
- Given a small site (C, J) (i.e. a small category C together with a Grothendieck topology J), the category of all sheaves of abelian groups on the site is a Grothendieck category.

=== Constructing further Grothendieck categories ===
- Any category that's equivalent to a Grothendieck category is itself a Grothendieck category.
- Given Grothendieck categories $\mathcal{A_1},\ldots,\mathcal{A_n}$, the product category $\mathcal{A_1}\times\ldots\times\mathcal{A_n}$ is a Grothendieck category.
- Given a small category $\mathcal{C}$ and a Grothendieck category $\mathcal{A}$, the functor category $\operatorname{Funct}(\mathcal{C},\mathcal{A})$, consisting of all covariant functors from $\mathcal{C}$ to $\mathcal{A}$, is a Grothendieck category.
- Given a small preadditive category $\mathcal{C}$ and a Grothendieck category $\mathcal{A}$, the functor category $\operatorname{Add}(\mathcal{C},\mathcal{A})$ of all additive covariant functors from $\mathcal{C}$ to $\mathcal{A}$ is a Grothendieck category.
- If $\mathcal{A}$ is a Grothendieck category and $\mathcal{C}$ is a localizing subcategory of $\mathcal{A}$, then both $\mathcal{C}$ and the Serre quotient category $\mathcal{A}/\mathcal{C}$ are Grothendieck categories.

== Properties and theorems ==
Every Grothendieck category contains an injective cogenerator. For example, an injective cogenerator of the category of abelian groups is the quotient group $\mathbb{Q}/\mathbb{Z}$.

Every object in a Grothendieck category $\mathcal{A}$ has an injective hull in $\mathcal{A}$. This allows to construct injective resolutions and thereby the use of the tools of homological algebra in $\mathcal{A}$, in order to define derived functors. (Note that not all Grothendieck categories allow projective resolutions for all objects; examples are categories of sheaves of abelian groups on many topological spaces, such as on the space of real numbers.)

In a Grothendieck category, any family of subobjects $(U_i)$ of a given object $X$ has a supremum (or "sum") $\sum_i U_i$ as well as an infimum (or "intersection") $\cap_i U_i$, both of which are again subobjects of $X$. Further, if the family $(U_i)$ is directed (i.e. for any two objects in the family, there is a third object in the family that contains the two), and $V$ is another subobject of $X$, we have

$$\sum_{i}(U_i\cap V) = \left(\sum_{i}U_i\right) \cap V.$$

Grothendieck categories are well-powered (sometimes called locally small, although that term is also used for a different concept), i.e. the collection of subobjects of any given object forms a set (rather than a proper class).

It is a rather deep result that every Grothendieck category $\mathcal{A}$ is complete, i.e. that arbitrary limits (and in particular products) exist in $\mathcal{A}$. By contrast, it follows directly from the definition that $\mathcal{A}$ is co-complete, i.e. that arbitrary colimits and coproducts (direct sums) exist in $\mathcal{A}$. Coproducts in a Grothendieck category are exact (i.e. the coproduct of a family of short exact sequences is again a short exact sequence), but products need not be exact.

A functor $F \colon {\cal A} \to {\cal X}$ from a Grothendieck category $\mathcal{A}$ to an arbitrary category $\mathcal{X}$ has a left adjoint if and only if it commutes with all limits, and it has a right adjoint if and only if it commutes with all colimits. This follows from Peter J. Freyd's special adjoint functor theorem and its dual.

The Gabriel–Popescu theorem states that any Grothendieck category $\mathcal{A}$ is equivalent to a full subcategory of the category $\operatorname{Mod}(R)$ of right modules over some unital ring $R$ (which can be taken to be the endomorphism ring of a generator of $\mathcal{A}$), and $\mathcal{A}$ can be obtained as a Gabriel quotient of $\operatorname{Mod}(R)$ by some localizing subcategory.

As a consequence of Gabriel–Popescu, one can show that every Grothendieck category is locally presentable. Furthermore, Gabriel-Popescu can be used to see that every Grothendieck category is complete, being a reflective subcategory of the complete category $\operatorname{Mod}(R)$ for some $R$.

Every small abelian category $\mathcal{C}$ can be embedded in a Grothendieck category, in the following fashion. The category $\mathcal{A}:=\operatorname{Lex}(\mathcal{C}^{op},\mathrm{Ab})$ of left-exact additive (covariant) functors $\mathcal{C}^{op}\rightarrow\mathrm{Ab}$ (where $\mathrm{Ab}$ denotes the category of abelian groups) is a Grothendieck category, and the functor $h\colon\mathcal{C}\rightarrow\mathcal{A}$, with $C\mapsto h_C=\operatorname{Hom}(-,C)$, is full, faithful and exact. A generator of $\mathcal{A}$ is given by the coproduct of all $h_C$, with $C\in\mathcal{C}$. The category $\mathcal{A}$ is equivalent to the category $\text{Ind}(\mathcal C)$ of ind-objects of $\mathcal{C}$ and the embedding $h$ corresponds to the natural embedding $\mathcal{C}\to\text{Ind}(\mathcal C)$. We may therefore view $\mathcal{A}$ as the co-completion of $\mathcal{C}$.

=== Special kinds of objects and Grothendieck categories ===
An object $X$ in a Grothendieck category is called finitely generated if, whenever $X$ is written as the sum of a family of subobjects of $X$, then it is already the sum of a finite subfamily. (In the case ${\cal A} = \operatorname{Mod}(R)$ of module categories, this notion is equivalent to the familiar notion of finitely generated modules.) Epimorphic images of finitely generated objects are again finitely generated. If $U\subseteq X$ and both $U$ and $X/U$ are finitely generated, then so is $X$. The object $X$ is finitely generated if, and only if, for any directed system $(A_i)$ in ${\cal A}$ in which each morphism is a monomorphism, the natural morphism $\varinjlim \mathrm{Hom}(X,A_i)\to \mathrm{Hom}(X,\varinjlim A_i)$ is an isomorphism. A Grothendieck category need not contain any non-zero finitely generated objects.

A Grothendieck category is called locally finitely generated if it has a set of finitely generated generators (i.e. if there exists a family $(G_i)_{i\in I}$ of finitely generated objects such that to every object $X$ there exist $i\in I$ and a non-zero morphism $G_{i}\rightarrow X$; equivalently: $X$ is epimorphic image of a direct sum of copies of the $G_{i}$). In such a category, every object is the sum of its finitely generated subobjects. Every category ${\cal A} = \operatorname{Mod}(R)$ is locally finitely generated.

An object $X$ in a Grothendieck category is called finitely presented if it is finitely generated and if every epimorphism $W\to X$ with finitely generated domain $W$ has a finitely generated kernel. Again, this generalizes the notion of finitely presented modules. If $U\subseteq X$ and both $U$ and $X/U$ are finitely presented, then so is $X$. In a locally finitely generated Grothendieck category ${\cal A}$, the finitely presented objects can be characterized as follows: $X$ in ${\cal A}$ is finitely presented if, and only if, for every directed system $(A_i)$ in ${\cal A}$, the natural morphism $\varinjlim \mathrm{Hom}(X,A_i)\to \mathrm{Hom}(X,\varinjlim A_i)$ is an isomorphism.

A Grothendieck category is locally finitely presented if it has a set of finitely presented generators, which is equivalent to saying that every object is a direct limit of finitely presented objects.

An object $X$ in a Grothendieck category ${\cal A}$ is called coherent if it is finitely presented and if each of its finitely generated subobjects is also finitely presented. (This generalizes the notion of coherent sheaves on a ringed space.) The full subcategory of all coherent objects in ${\cal A}$ is abelian and the inclusion functor is exact.

An object $X$ in a Grothendieck category is called Noetherian if the set of its subobjects satisfies the ascending chain condition, i.e. if every sequence $X_1\subseteq X_2 \subseteq \cdots$ of subobjects of $X$ eventually becomes stationary. This is the case if and only if every subobject of X is finitely generated. (In the case ${\cal A} = \operatorname{Mod}(R)$, this notion is equivalent to the familiar notion of Noetherian modules.) A Grothendieck category is called locally Noetherian if it has a set of Noetherian generators; an example is the category of left modules over a left-Noetherian ring.

A Grothendieck category is called spectral if every short exact sequence splits. To a given Grothendieck category ${\cal A}$ one can define a spectral Grothendieck category $\operatorname{Spec} {\cal A}$ and a canonical functor $P : {\cal A} \to \operatorname{Spec} {\cal A}$. The objects of $\operatorname{Spec} {\cal A}$ correspond, up to isomorphism, to the injective objects of ${\cal A}$. The functor $P$ turns all essential monomorphisms into isomorphisms and thus identifies each object of ${\cal A}$ with its injective hull. This allows to define useful dimension-like functions on ${\cal A}$: for each indecomposable injective object $I$ in ${\cal A}$ and every object $A$ in ${\cal A}$, the cardinal number $r_I(A)$ measures, roughly speaking, how many direct summands isomorphic to $I$ appear in the injective hull of $A$.
