= Quotient category =

Type of quotient object in mathematics

In mathematics, a quotient category is a category obtained from another category by identifying sets of morphisms. Formally, it is a quotient object in the category of (locally small) categories, analogous to a quotient group or quotient space, but in the categorical setting.

== Definition ==
Let $\mathbf C$ be a category. A congruence relation $\mathcal R$ on $\mathbf C$ is given by: for each pair of objects $X$, $Y$ in $\mathbf C$, an equivalence relation $\mathcal R_{X,Y}$ on $\mathrm{Hom}(X,Y)$, such that the equivalence relations respect composition of morphisms. That is, if

$$f_1,f_2 : X \to Y\,$$

are related in $\mathrm{Hom}(X, Y)$ and

$$g_1,g_2 : Y \to Z\,$$

are related in $\mathrm{Hom}(Y, Z)$, then $g_1f_1$ and $g_2f_2$ are related in $\mathrm{Hom}(X, Z)$.

Given a congruence relation $\mathcal R$ on $\mathbf C$ we can define the quotient category $\mathbf C/\mathcal R$ as the category whose objects are those of $\mathbf C$ and whose morphisms are equivalence classes of morphisms in $\mathbf C$. That is,

$$\mathrm{Hom}_{\mathbf{C}/\mathcal R}(X,Y) = \mathrm{Hom}_{\mathbf{C}}(X,Y)/\mathcal R_{X,Y}.$$

Composition of morphisms in $\mathbf C/\mathcal R$ is well-defined since $\mathcal R$ is a congruence relation.

== Properties ==
There is a natural quotient functor from $\mathbf C$ to $\mathbf C/\mathcal R$ which sends each morphism to its equivalence class. This functor is bijective on objects and surjective on Hom-sets (i.e. it is a full functor).

Every functor $F\colon \mathbf C \to \mathbf D$ determines a congruence on $\mathbf C$ by saying $f\sim g$ iff $F(f)=F(g)$. The functor $F$ then factors through the quotient functor $\mathbf C\to\mathbf C/\sim$ in a unique manner. This may be regarded as the "first isomorphism theorem" for categories.

== Examples ==
- Monoids and groups may be regarded as categories with one object. In this case the quotient category coincides with the notion of a quotient monoid or a quotient group.
- The homotopy category of topological spaces hTop is a quotient category of Top, the category of topological spaces. The equivalence classes of morphisms are homotopy classes of continuous maps.
- Let k be a field and consider the abelian category Mod(k) of all vector spaces over k with k-linear maps as morphisms. To "kill" all finite-dimensional spaces, we can call two linear maps f,g : X → Y congruent iff their difference has finite-dimensional image. In the resulting quotient category, all finite-dimensional vector spaces are isomorphic to 0. [This is actually an example of a quotient of additive categories, see below.]

== Related concepts ==
=== Quotients of additive categories modulo ideals ===
If C is an additive category and we require the congruence relation ~ on C to be additive (i.e. if f_{1}, f_{2}, g_{1} and g_{2} are morphisms from X to Y with f_{1} ~ f_{2} and g_{1} ~g_{2}, then f_{1} + g_{1} ~ f_{2} + g_{2}), then the quotient category C/~ will also be additive, and the quotient functor C → C/~ will be an additive functor.

The concept of an additive congruence relation is equivalent to the concept of a two-sided ideal of morphisms: for any two objects X and Y we are given an additive subgroup I(X,Y) of Hom_{C}(X, Y) such that for all f ∈ I(X,Y), g ∈ Hom_{C}(Y, Z) and h∈ Hom_{C}(W, X), we have gf ∈ I(X,Z) and fh ∈ I(W,Y). Two morphisms in Hom_{C}(X, Y) are congruent iff their difference is in I(X,Y).

Every unital ring may be viewed as an additive category with a single object, and the quotient of additive categories defined above coincides in this case with the notion of a quotient ring modulo a two-sided ideal.

=== Localization of a category ===
The localization of a category introduces new morphisms to turn several of the original category's morphisms into isomorphisms. This tends to increase the number of morphisms between objects, rather than decrease it as in the case of quotient categories. But in both constructions it often happens that two objects become isomorphic that weren't isomorphic in the original category.

=== Serre quotients of abelian categories ===
The Serre quotient of an abelian category by a Serre subcategory is a new abelian category which is similar to a quotient category but also in many cases has the character of a localization of the category.
