= Giraud subcategory =

Mathematical subcategories of Grothendieck categories

In mathematics, Giraud subcategories form an important class of subcategories of Grothendieck categories. They are named after Jean Giraud.

== Definition ==
Let $\mathcal{A}$ be a Grothendieck category. A full subcategory $\mathcal{B}$ is called reflective, if the inclusion functor $i\colon\mathcal{B}\rightarrow\mathcal{A}$ has a left adjoint. If this left adjoint of $i$ also preserves kernels, then $\mathcal{B}$ is called a Giraud subcategory.

== Properties ==
Let $\mathcal{B}$ be Giraud in the Grothendieck category $\mathcal{A}$ and $i\colon\mathcal{B}\rightarrow\mathcal{A}$ the inclusion functor.

- $\mathcal{B}$ is again a Grothendieck category.
- An object $X$ in $\mathcal{B}$ is injective if and only if $i(X)$ is injective in $\mathcal{A}$.
- The left adjoint $a\colon\mathcal{A}\rightarrow\mathcal{B}$ of $i$ is exact.
- Let $\mathcal{C}$ be a localizing subcategory of $\mathcal{A}$ and $\mathcal{A}/\mathcal{C}$ be the associated quotient category. The section functor $S\colon\mathcal{A}/\mathcal{C}\rightarrow\mathcal{A}$ is fully faithful and induces an equivalence between $\mathcal{A}/\mathcal{C}$ and the Giraud subcategory $\mathcal{B}$ given by the $\mathcal{C}$-closed objects in $\mathcal{A}$.

== See also ==
- Localizing subcategory
