= Quotient of an abelian category =

Mathematical concept

In mathematics, the quotient (also called Serre quotient or Gabriel quotient) of an abelian category $\mathcal{A}$ by a Serre subcategory $\mathcal{B}$ is the abelian category $\mathcal{A}/\mathcal{B}$ which, intuitively, is obtained from $\mathcal{A}$ by ignoring (i.e. treating as zero) all objects from $\mathcal{B}$. There is a canonical exact functor $Q \colon \mathcal{A} \to \mathcal{A}/\mathcal{B}$ whose kernel is $\mathcal B$, and $\mathcal{A}/\mathcal{B}$ is in a certain sense the most general abelian category with this property.

Forming Serre quotients of abelian categories is thus formally akin to forming quotients of groups. Serre quotients are somewhat similar to quotient categories, the difference being that with Serre quotients all involved categories are abelian and all functors are exact. Serre quotients also often have the character of localizations of categories, especially if the Serre subcategory is localizing.

== Definition ==
Formally, $\mathcal A/\mathcal B$ is the category whose objects are those of $\mathcal A$ and whose morphisms from X to Y are given by the direct limit (of abelian groups)

$$\mathrm{Hom}_{\mathcal A/\mathcal B}(X,Y):=\varinjlim \mathrm{Hom}_\mathcal A(X', Y/Y')$$

where the limit is taken over subobjects $X' \subseteq X$ and $Y' \subseteq Y$ such that $X/X'\in \cal{B}$ and $Y' \in \cal{B}$. (Here, $X/X'$ and $Y/Y'$ denote quotient objects computed in $\mathcal A$.) These pairs of subobjects are ordered by $(X',Y')\preccurlyeq(X'',Y'') \Longleftrightarrow X''\subseteq X' \text{ and } Y'\subseteq Y''$.

Composition of morphisms in $\mathcal{A}/\mathcal{B}$ is induced by the universal property of the direct limit.

The canonical functor $Q \colon \mathcal A \to \mathcal A/\mathcal B$ sends an object X to itself and a morphism $f \colon X \to Y$ to the corresponding element of the direct limit with X′ = X and Y′ = 0.

An alternative, equivalent construction of the quotient category uses what is called a "calculus of fractions" to define the morphisms of $\mathcal A/\mathcal B$. Here, one starts with the class $S$ of those morphisms in $\mathcal A$ whose kernel and cokernel both belong to $\mathcal{B}$. This is a multiplicative system in the sense of Gabriel-Zisman, and one can localize the category $\mathcal A$ at the system $S$ to obtain $\mathcal A/\mathcal B:=\mathcal A[S^{-1}]$.

== Examples ==
Let $k$ be a field and consider the abelian category ${\rm Mod}(k)$ of all vector spaces over $k$. Then the full subcategory ${\rm mod}(k)$ of finite-dimensional vector spaces is a Serre-subcategory of ${\rm Mod}(k)$. The Serre quotient $\cal{C} = {\rm Mod}(k)/{\rm mod}(k)$ has as objects the $k$-vector spaces, and the set of morphisms from $X$ to $Y$ in $\cal{C}$ is
$$\{k\text{-linear maps from } X \text{ to } Y\}/\{k\text{-linear maps from } X \text{ to } Y \text{ with finite-dimensional image}\}$$
(which is a quotient of vector spaces). This has the effect of identifying all finite-dimensional vector spaces with 0, and of identifying two linear maps whenever their difference has finite-dimensional image. This example shows that the Serre quotient can behave like a quotient category.

For another example, take the abelian category Ab of all abelian groups and the Serre subcategory of all torsion abelian groups. The Serre quotient here is equivalent to the category $\operatorname{Mod}(\Bbb{Q})$ of all vector spaces over the rationals, with the canonical functor $\mathbf{Ab}\to\operatorname{Mod}(\Bbb{Q})$ given by tensoring with $\Bbb{Q}$. Similarly, the Serre quotient of the category of finitely generated abelian groups by the subcategory of finitely generated torsion groups is equivalent to the category of finite-dimensional vectorspaces over $\Bbb{Q}$. Here, the Serre quotient behaves like a localization.

== Properties ==
The Serre quotient $\mathcal A/\mathcal B$ is an abelian category, and the canonical functor $Q \colon \mathcal{A} \to \mathcal{A}/\mathcal{B}$ is exact and surjective on objects. The kernel of $Q$ is $\mathcal B$, i.e., $Q(X)$ is zero in $\mathcal{A}/\mathcal{B}$ if and only if $X$ belongs to $\mathcal{B}$.

The Serre quotient and canonical functor are characterized by the following universal property: if $\mathcal C$ is any abelian category and $F \colon \mathcal A \to \mathcal C$ is an exact functor such that $F(X)$ is a zero in $\mathcal C$ for each object $X \in \mathcal B$, then there is a unique exact functor $\overline{F} \colon \mathcal A/\mathcal B \to \mathcal C$ such that $F = \overline{F} \circ Q$.

Given three abelian categories $\mathcal{A}$, $\mathcal{B}$, $\mathcal{C}$, we have

$$\mathcal A/\mathcal B \cong \mathcal C$$

if and only if

there exists an exact and essentially surjective functor $F \colon \mathcal A \to \mathcal C$ whose kernel is $\mathcal{B}$ and such that for every morphism $f:FX\to FY$ in $\mathcal C$ there exist morphisms $\phi:W\to X$ and $\psi:W\to Y$ in $\mathcal A$ so that $F\phi$ is an isomorphism and $f=(F\psi)\circ(F\phi)^{-1}$.

== Theorems involving Serre quotients ==
=== Serre's description of coherent sheaves on a projective scheme ===
According to a theorem by Jean-Pierre Serre, the category $\operatorname{coh}(X)$ of coherent sheaves on a projective scheme $X=\operatorname{Proj}(R)$ (where $R$ is a commutative noetherian graded ring, graded by the non-negative integers and generated by degree-0 and finitely many degree-1 elements, and $\operatorname{Proj}(R)$ refers to the Proj construction) can be described as the Serre quotient

$$\operatorname{coh}(X) \cong \operatorname{mod}^\Bbb{Z}(R)\ / \ \operatorname{mod}_{\mathrm{tor}}^\Bbb{Z}(R)$$

where $\operatorname{mod}^\Bbb{Z}(R)$ denotes the category of finitely-generated graded modules over $R$ and $\operatorname{mod}_{\mathrm{tor}}^\Bbb{Z}(R)$ is the Serre subcategory consisting of all those graded modules $M$ which are 0 in all degrees that are high enough, i.e. for which there exists $n_0\in\Bbb{N}$ such that $M_n=0$ for all $n\geq n_0$.

A similar description exists for the category of quasi-coherent sheaves on $X=\operatorname{Proj}(R)$, even if $R$ is not noetherian.

=== Gabriel–Popescu theorem ===
The Gabriel–Popescu theorem states that any Grothendieck category $\mathcal{A}$ is equivalent to a Serre quotient of the form $\operatorname{Mod}(R)/\cal{B}$, where $\operatorname{Mod}(R)$ denotes the abelian category of right modules over some unital ring $R$, and $\cal{B}$ is some localizing subcategory of $\operatorname{Mod}(R)$.

=== Quillen's localization theorem ===
Daniel Quillen's algebraic K-theory assigns to each exact category $\mathcal{C}$ a sequence of abelian groups $K_n(\mathcal C),\ n\geq 0$, and this assignment is functorial in $\mathcal{C}$. Quillen proved that, if $\mathcal{B}$ is a Serre subcategory of the abelian category $\mathcal{A}$, there is a long exact sequence of the form

$$\cdots \to K_n(\mathcal B) \to K_n(\mathcal A) \to K_n(\mathcal {A/B})\to K_{n-1}(\mathcal B)\to\cdots\to K_0(\mathcal {A/B})\to 0$$
