= Coherent sheaf =

Generalization of vector bundles

In mathematics, especially in algebraic geometry and the theory of complex manifolds, coherent sheaves are a class of sheaves closely linked to the geometric properties of the underlying space. The definition of coherent sheaves is made with reference to a sheaf of rings that codifies this geometric information.

Coherent sheaves can be seen as a generalization of vector bundles. Unlike vector bundles, they form an abelian category, and so they are closed under operations such as taking kernels, images, and cokernels. The quasi-coherent sheaves are a generalization of coherent sheaves and include the locally free sheaves of infinite rank.

Coherent sheaf cohomology is a powerful technique, in particular for studying the sections of a given coherent sheaf.

== Definitions ==
A quasi-coherent sheaf on a ringed space $(X, \mathcal O_X)$ is a sheaf $\mathcal F$ of $\mathcal O_X$-modules that has a local presentation, that is, every point in $X$ has an open neighborhood $U$ in which there is an exact sequence

$$\mathcal{O}_X^{\oplus I}|_{U} \to \mathcal{O}_X^{\oplus J}|_{U} \to \mathcal{F}|_{U} \to 0$$

for some (possibly infinite) sets $I$ and $J$.

A coherent sheaf on a ringed space $(X, \mathcal O_X)$ is a sheaf $\mathcal F$ of $\mathcal O_X$-modules satisfying the following two properties:

1. $\mathcal F$ is of finite type over $\mathcal O_X$, that is, every point in $X$ has an open neighborhood $U$ in $X$ such that there is a surjective morphism $\mathcal{O}_X^n|_{U} \to \mathcal{F}|_{U}$ for some natural number $n$;
2. for any open set $U\subseteq X$, any natural number $n$, and any morphism $\varphi: \mathcal{O}_X^n|_{U} \to \mathcal{F}|_{U}$ of $\mathcal O_X$-modules, the kernel of $\varphi$ is of finite type.

Morphisms between (quasi-)coherent sheaves are the same as morphisms of sheaves of $\mathcal O_X$-modules.

=== The case of schemes ===
When $X$ is a scheme, the general definitions above are equivalent to more explicit ones. A sheaf $\mathcal F$ of $\mathcal O_X$-modules is quasi-coherent if and only if over each open affine subscheme $U=\operatorname{Spec} A$ the restriction $\mathcal F|_U$ is isomorphic to the sheaf $\tilde{M}$ associated to the module $M=\Gamma(U, \mathcal F)$ over $A$. When $X$ is a locally Noetherian scheme, $\mathcal F$ is coherent if and only if it is quasi-coherent and the modules $M$ above can be taken to be finitely generated.

On an affine scheme $U = \operatorname{Spec} A$, there is an equivalence of categories from $A$-modules to quasi-coherent sheaves, taking a module $M$ to the associated sheaf $\tilde{M}$. The inverse equivalence takes a quasi-coherent sheaf $\mathcal F$ on $U$ to the $A$-module $\mathcal F(U)$ of global sections of $\mathcal F$.

Here are several further characterizations of quasi-coherent sheaves on a scheme.

Theorem—Let $X$ be a scheme and $\mathcal F$ an $\mathcal O_X$-module on it. Then the following are equivalent.

- $\mathcal F$ is quasi-coherent.
- For each open affine subscheme $U$ of $X$, $\mathcal F|_U$ is isomorphic as an $\mathcal O_U$-module to the sheaf $\tilde M$ associated to some $\mathcal O(U)$-module $M$.
- There is an open affine cover $\{U_\alpha \}$ of $X$ such that for each $U_\alpha$ of the cover, $\mathcal F|_{U_\alpha}$ is isomorphic to the sheaf associated to some $\mathcal O(U_\alpha)$-module.
- For each pair of open affine subschemes $V\subseteq U$ of $X$, the natural homomorphism
  $$\mathcal O(V) \otimes_{\mathcal O(U)} \mathcal F(U) \to \mathcal F(V), \, f \otimes s \mapsto f\cdot s|_V$$

is an isomorphism.

- For each open affine subscheme $U = \operatorname{Spec} A$ of $X$ and each $f\in A$, writing $U_f$ for the open subscheme of $U$ where $f$ is not zero, the natural homomorphism
  $$\mathcal F(U)\bigg[\frac{1}{f}\bigg] \to \mathcal F(U_f)$$

is an isomorphism. The homomorphism comes from the universal property of localization.

== Properties ==
On an arbitrary ringed space, quasi-coherent sheaves do not necessarily form an abelian category. On the other hand, the quasi-coherent sheaves on any scheme form an abelian category, and they are extremely useful in that context.

On any ringed space $X$, the coherent sheaves form an abelian category, a full subcategory of the category of $\mathcal O_X$-modules. (Analogously, the category of coherent modules over any ring $A$ is a full abelian subcategory of the category of all $A$-modules.) So the kernel, image, and cokernel of any map of coherent sheaves are coherent. The direct sum of two coherent sheaves is coherent; more generally, an $\mathcal O_X$-module that is an extension of two coherent sheaves is coherent.

A submodule of a coherent sheaf is coherent if it is of finite type. A coherent sheaf is always an $\mathcal O_X$-module of finite presentation, meaning that each point $x$ in $X$ has an open neighborhood $U$ such that the restriction $\mathcal F|_U$ of $\mathcal F$ to $U$ is isomorphic to the cokernel of a morphism $\mathcal O_X^n|_U \to \mathcal O_X^m|_U$ for some natural numbers $n$ and $m$. If $\mathcal O_X$ is coherent, then, conversely, every sheaf of finite presentation over $\mathcal O_X$ is coherent.

The sheaf of rings $\mathcal O_X$ is called coherent if it is coherent considered as a sheaf of modules over itself. In particular, the Oka coherence theorem states that the sheaf of holomorphic functions on a complex analytic space $X$ is a coherent sheaf of rings. The main part of the proof is the case $X = \mathbf C^n$. Likewise, on a locally Noetherian scheme $X$, the structure sheaf $\mathcal O_X$ is a coherent sheaf of rings.

== Basic constructions of coherent sheaves ==
- An $\mathcal O_X$-module $\mathcal F$ on a ringed space $X$ is called locally free of finite rank, or a vector bundle, if every point in $X$ has an open neighborhood $U$ such that the restriction $\mathcal F|_U$ is isomorphic to a finite direct sum of copies of $\mathcal O_X|_U$. If $\mathcal F$ is free of the same rank $n$ near every point of $X$, then the vector bundle $\mathcal F$ is said to be of rank $n$.

Vector bundles in this sheaf-theoretic sense over a scheme $X$ are equivalent to vector bundles defined in a more geometric way, as a scheme $E$ with a morphism $\pi: E\to X$ and with a covering of $X$ by open sets $U_\alpha$ with given isomorphisms $\pi^{-1}(U_\alpha) \cong \mathbb A^n \times U_\alpha$ over $U_\alpha$ such that the two isomorphisms over an intersection $U_\alpha \cap U_\beta$ differ by a linear automorphism. (The analogous equivalence also holds for complex analytic spaces.) For example, given a vector bundle $E$ in this geometric sense, the corresponding sheaf $\mathcal F$ is defined by: over an open set $U$ of $X$, the $\mathcal O(U)$-module $\mathcal F(U)$ is the set of sections of the morphism $\pi^{-1}(U) \to U$. The sheaf-theoretic interpretation of vector bundles has the advantage that vector bundles (on a locally Noetherian scheme) are included in the abelian category of coherent sheaves.

- Locally free sheaves come equipped with the standard $\mathcal O_X$-module operations, but these give back locally free sheaves.
- Let $X = \operatorname{Spec}(R)$, $R$ a Noetherian ring. Then vector bundles on $X$ are exactly the sheaves associated to finitely generated projective modules over $R$, or (equivalently) to finitely generated flat modules over $R$.
- Let $X = \operatorname{Proj}(R)$, $R$ a Noetherian $\N$-graded ring, be a projective scheme over a Noetherian ring $R_0$. Then each $\Z$-graded $R$-module $M$ determines a quasi-coherent sheaf $\mathcal F$ on $X$ such that $\mathcal F|_{\{ f \ne 0 \}}$ is the sheaf associated to the $R[f^{-1}]_0$-module $M[f^{-1}]_0$, where $f$ is a homogeneous element of $R$ of positive degree and $\{f \ne 0 \} = \operatorname{Spec} R[f^{-1}]_0$ is the locus where $f$ does not vanish.
- For example, for each integer $n$, let $R(n)$ denote the graded $R$-module given by $R(n)_l =R_{n+l}$. Then each $R(n)$ determines the quasi-coherent sheaf $\mathcal O_X(n)$ on $X$. If $R$ is generated as $R_0$-algebra by $R_1$, then $\mathcal O_X(n)$ is a line bundle (invertible sheaf) on $X$ and $\mathcal O_X(n)$ is the $n$-th tensor power of $\mathcal O_X(1)$. In particular, $\mathcal O_{\mathbb{P}^n}(-1)$ is called the tautological line bundle on the projective $n$-space.
- A simple example of a coherent sheaf on $\mathbb{P}^2$ that is not a vector bundle is given by the cokernel in the following sequence

$$\mathcal{O}(1) \xrightarrow{\cdot (x^2-yz,y^3 + xy^2 - xyz)} \mathcal{O}(3)\oplus \mathcal{O}(4) \to \mathcal{E} \to 0$$

this is because $\mathcal{E}$ restricted to the vanishing locus of the two polynomials has two-dimensional fibers, and has one-dimensional fibers elsewhere.

- Ideal sheaves: If $Z$ is a closed subscheme of a locally Noetherian scheme $X$, the sheaf $\mathcal I_{Z/X}$ of all regular functions vanishing on $Z$ is coherent. Likewise, if $Z$ is a closed analytic subspace of a complex analytic space $X$, the ideal sheaf $\mathcal I_{Z/X}$ is coherent.
- The structure sheaf $\mathcal O_Z$ of a closed subscheme $Z$ of a locally Noetherian scheme $X$ can be viewed as a coherent sheaf on $X$. To be precise, this is the direct image sheaf $i_*\mathcal O_Z$, where $i: Z \to X$ is the inclusion. Likewise for a closed analytic subspace of a complex analytic space. The sheaf $i_*\mathcal O_Z$ has fiber (defined below) of dimension zero at points in the open set $X-Z$, and fiber of dimension 1 at points in $Z$. There is a short exact sequence of coherent sheaves on $X$:

$$0\to \mathcal I_{Z/X} \to \mathcal O_X \to i_*\mathcal O_Z \to 0.$$

- Most operations of linear algebra preserve coherent sheaves. In particular, for coherent sheaves $\mathcal F$ and $\mathcal G$ on a ringed space $X$, the tensor product sheaf $\mathcal F \otimes_{\mathcal O_X}\mathcal G$ and the sheaf of homomorphisms $\mathcal Hom_{\mathcal O_X}(\mathcal F, \mathcal G)$ are coherent.
- A simple non-example of a quasi-coherent sheaf is given by the extension by zero functor. For example, consider $i_!\mathcal{O}_X$ for

$X = \operatorname{Spec}(\Complex[x,x^{-1}]) \xrightarrow{i} \operatorname{Spec}(\Complex[x])=Y$

Since this sheaf has non-trivial stalks, but zero global sections, this cannot be a quasi-coherent sheaf. This is because quasi-coherent sheaves on an affine scheme are equivalent to the category of modules over the underlying ring, and the adjunction comes from taking global sections.

== Functoriality ==
Let $f: X\to Y$ be a morphism of ringed spaces (for example, a morphism of schemes). If $\mathcal F$ is a quasi-coherent sheaf on $Y$, then the inverse image $\mathcal O_X$-module (or pullback) $f^*\mathcal F$ is quasi-coherent on $X$. For a morphism of schemes $f: X\to Y$ and a coherent sheaf $\mathcal F$ on $Y$, the pullback $f^*\mathcal F$ is not coherent in full generality (for example, $f^*\mathcal O_Y = \mathcal O_X$, which might not be coherent), but pullbacks of coherent sheaves are coherent if $X$ is locally Noetherian. An important special case is the pullback of a vector bundle, which is a vector bundle.

If $f: X\to Y$ is a quasi-compact quasi-separated morphism of schemes and $\mathcal F$ is a quasi-coherent sheaf on $X$, then the direct image sheaf (or pushforward) $f_*\mathcal F$ is quasi-coherent on $Y$.

The direct image of a coherent sheaf is often not coherent. For example, for a field $k$, let $X$ be the affine line over $k$, and consider the morphism $f: X\to \operatorname{Spec}(k)$; then the direct image $f_*\mathcal O_X$ is the sheaf on $\operatorname{Spec}(k)$ associated to the polynomial ring $k[x]$, which is not coherent because $k[x]$ has infinite dimension as a $k$-vector space. On the other hand, the direct image of a coherent sheaf under a proper morphism is coherent, by results of Grauert and Grothendieck.

== Local behavior of coherent sheaves ==
An important feature of coherent sheaves $\mathcal F$ is that the properties of $\mathcal F$ at a point $x$ control the behavior of $\mathcal F$ in a neighborhood of $x$, more than would be true for an arbitrary sheaf. For example, Nakayama's lemma says (in geometric language) that if $\mathcal F$ is a coherent sheaf on a scheme $X$, then the fiber $\mathcal F_x\otimes_{\mathcal O_{X,x}} k(x)$ of $F$ at a point $x$ (a vector space over the residue field $k(x)$) is zero if and only if the sheaf $\mathcal F$ is zero on some open neighborhood of $x$. A related fact is that the dimension of the fibers of a coherent sheaf is upper-semicontinuous. Thus a coherent sheaf has constant rank on an open set, while the rank can jump up on a lower-dimensional closed subset.

In the same spirit: a coherent sheaf $\mathcal F$ on a scheme $X$ is a vector bundle if and only if its stalk $\mathcal F_x$ is a free module over the local ring $\mathcal O_{X,x}$ for every point $x$ in $X$.

On a general scheme, one cannot determine whether a coherent sheaf is a vector bundle just from its fibers (as opposed to its stalks). On a reduced locally Noetherian scheme, however, a coherent sheaf is a vector bundle if and only if its rank is locally constant.

== Examples of vector bundles ==
For a morphism of schemes $X\to Y$, let $\Delta: X\to X\times_Y X$ be the diagonal morphism, which is a closed immersion if $X$ is separated over $Y$. Let $\mathcal I$ be the ideal sheaf of $X$ in $X\times_Y X$. Then the sheaf of differentials $\Omega^1_{X/Y}$ can be defined as the pullback $\Delta^*\mathcal I$ of $\mathcal I$ to $X$. Sections of this sheaf are called 1-forms on $X$ over $Y$, and they can be written locally on $X$ as finite sums $\textstyle\sum f_j\, dg_j$ for regular functions $f_j$ and $g_j$. If $X$ is locally of finite type over a field $k$, then $\Omega^1_{X/k}$ is a coherent sheaf on $X$.

If $X$ is smooth over $k$, then $\Omega^1$ (meaning $\Omega^1_{X/k}$) is a vector bundle over $X$, called the cotangent bundle of $X$. Then the tangent bundle $TX$ is defined to be the dual bundle $(\Omega^1)^*$. For $X$ smooth over $k$ of dimension $n$ everywhere, the tangent bundle has rank $n$.

If $Y$ is a smooth closed subscheme of a smooth scheme $X$ over $k$, then there is a short exact sequence of vector bundles on $Y$:

$$0\to TY \to TX|_Y \to N_{Y/X}\to 0,$$

which can be used as a definition of the normal bundle $N_{Y/X}$ to $Y$ in $X$.

For a smooth scheme $X$ over a field $k$ and a natural number $i$, the vector bundle $\Omega^i$ of i-forms on $X$ is defined as the $i$-th exterior power of the cotangent bundle, $\Omega^i = \Lambda^i \Omega^1$. For a smooth variety $X$ of dimension $n$ over $k$, the canonical bundle $K_X$ means the line bundle $\Omega^n$. Thus sections of the canonical bundle are algebro-geometric analogs of volume forms on $X$. For example, a section of the canonical bundle of affine space $\mathbb A^n$ over $k$ can be written as

$$f(x_1,\ldots,x_n) \; dx_1 \wedge\cdots\wedge dx_n,$$

where $f$ is a polynomial with coefficients in $k$.

Let $R$ be a commutative ring and $n$ a natural number. For each integer $j$, there is an important example of a line bundle on projective space $\mathbb P^n$ over $R$, called $\mathcal O(j)$. To define this, consider the morphism of $R$-schemes

$$\pi: \mathbb A^{n+1}-0\to \mathbb P^n$$

given in coordinates by $(x_0,\ldots,x_n) \mapsto [x_0,\ldots,x_n]$. (That is, thinking of projective space as the space of 1-dimensional linear subspaces of affine space, send a nonzero point in affine space to the line that it spans.) Then a section of $\mathcal O(j)$ over an open subset $U$ of $\mathbb P^n$ is defined to be a regular function $f$ on $\pi^{-1}(U)$ that is homogeneous of degree $j$, meaning that

$$f(ax)=a^jf(x)$$

as regular functions on ($\mathbb A^{1} - 0) \times \pi^{-1}(U)$. For all integers $i$ and $j$, there is an isomorphism $\mathcal O(i) \otimes \mathcal O(j) \cong \mathcal O(i+j)$ of line bundles on $\mathbb P^n$.

In particular, every homogeneous polynomial in $x_0,\ldots,x_n$ of degree $j$ over $R$ can be viewed as a global section of $\mathcal O(j)$ over $\mathbb P^n$. Note that every closed subscheme of projective space can be defined as the zero set of some collection of homogeneous polynomials, hence as the zero set of some sections of the line bundles $\mathcal O(j)$. This contrasts with the simpler case of affine space, where a closed subscheme is simply the zero set of some collection of regular functions. The regular functions on projective space $\mathbb P^n$ over $R$ are just the "constants" (the ring $R$), and so it is essential to work with the line bundles $\mathcal O(j)$.

Serre gave an algebraic description of all coherent sheaves on projective space, more subtle than what happens for affine space. Namely, let $R$ be a Noetherian ring (for example, a field), and consider the polynomial ring $S = R[x_0,\ldots,x_n]$ as a graded ring with each $x_i$ having degree 1. Then every finitely generated graded $S$-module $M$ has an associated coherent sheaf $\tilde M$ on $\mathbb P^n$ over $R$. Every coherent sheaf on $\mathbb P^n$ arises in this way from a finitely generated graded $S$-module $M$. (For example, the line bundle $\mathcal O(j)$ is the sheaf associated to the $S$-module $S$ with its grading lowered by $j$.) But the $S$-module $M$ that yields a given coherent sheaf on $\mathbb P^n$ is not unique; it is only unique up to changing $M$ by graded modules that are nonzero in only finitely many degrees. More precisely, the abelian category of coherent sheaves on $\mathbb P^n$ is the quotient of the category of finitely generated graded $S$-modules by the Serre subcategory of modules that are nonzero in only finitely many degrees.

The tangent bundle of projective space $\mathbb P^n$ over a field $k$ can be described in terms of the line bundle $\mathcal O(1)$. Namely, there is a short exact sequence, the Euler sequence:

$$0\to \mathcal O_{\mathbb P^n}\to \mathcal O(1)^{\oplus \; n+1}\to T\mathbb P^n\to 0.$$

It follows that the canonical bundle $K_{\mathbb P^n}$ (the dual of the determinant line bundle of the tangent bundle) is isomorphic to $\mathcal O(-n-1)$. This is a fundamental calculation for algebraic geometry. For example, the fact that the canonical bundle is a negative multiple of the ample line bundle $\mathcal O(1)$ means that projective space is a Fano variety. Over the complex numbers, this means that projective space has a Kähler metric with positive Ricci curvature.

=== Vector bundles on a hypersurface ===
Consider a smooth degree-$d$ hypersurface $X \subseteq \mathbb{P}^n$ defined by the homogeneous polynomial $f$ of degree $d$. Then, there is an exact sequence

$$0 \to \mathcal O_X(-d) \to i^*\Omega_{\mathbb{P}^n} \to \Omega_X \to 0$$

where the second map is the pullback of differential forms, and the first map sends

$$\phi \mapsto d(f\cdot \phi)$$

Note that this sequence tells us that $\mathcal O(-d)$ is the conormal sheaf of $X$ in $\mathbb P^n$. Dualizing this yields the exact sequence

$$0 \to T_X \to i^*T_{\mathbb{P}^n} \to \mathcal O(d) \to 0$$

hence $\mathcal O(d)$ is the normal bundle of $X$ in $\mathbb P^n$. If we use the fact that given an exact sequence

$$0 \to \mathcal E_1 \to \mathcal E_2 \to \mathcal E_3 \to 0$$

of vector bundles with ranks $r_1$,$r_2$,$r_3$, there is an isomorphism

$$\Lambda^{r_2}\mathcal E_2 \cong \Lambda^{r_1}\mathcal E_1\otimes \Lambda^{r_3}\mathcal E_3$$

of line bundles, then we see that there is the isomorphism

$$i^*\omega_{\mathbb P^n} \cong \omega_X\otimes \mathcal O_X(-d)$$

showing that

$$\omega_X \cong \mathcal O_X(d - n -1)$$

== Serre construction and vector bundles ==
One useful technique for constructing rank 2 vector bundles is the Serre construction^{pg 3} which establishes a correspondence between rank 2 vector bundles $\mathcal{E}$ on a smooth projective variety $X$ and codimension 2 subvarieties $Y$ using a certain $\text{Ext}^1$-group calculated on $X$. This is given by a cohomological condition on the line bundle $\wedge^2\mathcal{E}$ (see below).

The correspondence in one direction is given as follows: for a section $s \in \Gamma(X,\mathcal{E})$ we can associated the vanishing locus $V(s) \subseteq X$. If $V(s)$ is a codimension 2 subvariety, then

1. It is a local complete intersection, meaning if we take an affine chart $U_i \subseteq X$ then $s|_{U_i} \in \Gamma(U_i,\mathcal{E})$ can be represented as a function $s_i:U_i \to \mathbb{A}^2$, where $s_i(p) = (s_i^1(p), s_i^2(p))$ and $V(s)\cap U_i = V(s_i^1,s_i^2)$
2. The line bundle $\omega_X\otimes \wedge^2\mathcal{E}|_{V(s)}$ is isomorphic to the canonical bundle $\omega_{V(s)}$ on $V(s)$

In the other direction, for a codimension 2 subvariety $Y \subseteq X$ and a line bundle $\mathcal{L} \to X$ such that

1. $H^1(X,\mathcal{L}) = H^2(X,\mathcal{L}) = 0$
2. $\omega_Y \cong (\omega_X\otimes\mathcal{L})|_Y$

there is a canonical isomorphism

$\text{Hom}((\omega_X\otimes\mathcal{L})|_Y,\omega_Y) \cong \text{Ext}^1(\mathcal{I}_Y\otimes\mathcal{L}, \mathcal{O}_X)$,

which is functorial with respect to inclusion of codimension $2$ subvarieties. Moreover, any isomorphism given on the left corresponds to a locally free sheaf in the middle of the extension on the right. That is, for $s \in \text{Hom}((\omega_X\otimes\mathcal{L})|_Y,\omega_Y)$ that is an isomorphism there is a corresponding locally free sheaf $\mathcal{E}$ of rank 2 that fits into a short exact sequence

$0 \to \mathcal{O}_X \to \mathcal{E} \to \mathcal{I}_Y\otimes\mathcal{L} \to 0$

This vector bundle can then be further studied using cohomological invariants to determine if it is stable or not. This forms the basis for studying moduli of stable vector bundles in many specific cases, such as on principally polarized abelian varieties and K3 surfaces.

== Chern classes and algebraic K-theory ==
A vector bundle $E$ on a smooth variety $X$ over a field has Chern classes in the Chow ring of $X$, $c_i(E)$ in $CH^i(X)$ for $i\geq 0$. These satisfy the same formal properties as Chern classes in topology. For example, for any short exact sequence

$$0\to A \to B \to C \to 0$$

of vector bundles on $X$, the Chern classes of $B$ are given by

$$c_i(B) = c_i(A)+c_1(A)c_{i-1}(C)+\cdots+c_{i-1}(A)c_1(C)+c_i(C).$$

It follows that the Chern classes of a vector bundle $E$ depend only on the class of $E$ in the Grothendieck group $K_0(X)$. By definition, for a scheme $X$, $K_0(X)$ is the quotient of the free abelian group on the set of isomorphism classes of vector bundles on $X$ by the relation that $[B] = [A] + [C]$ for any short exact sequence as above. Although $K_0(X)$ is hard to compute in general, algebraic K-theory provides many tools for studying it, including a sequence of related groups $K_i(X)$ for integers $i>0$.

A variant is the group $G_0(X)$ (or $K_0'(X)$), the Grothendieck group of coherent sheaves on $X$. (In topological terms, G-theory has the formal properties of a Borel–Moore homology theory for schemes, while K-theory is the corresponding cohomology theory.) The natural homomorphism $K_0(X)\to G_0(X)$ is an isomorphism if $X$ is a regular separated Noetherian scheme, using that every coherent sheaf has a finite resolution by vector bundles in that case. For example, that gives a definition of the Chern classes of a coherent sheaf on a smooth variety over a field.

More generally, a Noetherian scheme $X$ is said to have the resolution property if every coherent sheaf on $X$ has a surjection from some vector bundle on $X$. For example, every quasi-projective scheme over a Noetherian ring has the resolution property.

=== Applications of resolution property ===
Since the resolution property states that a coherent sheaf $\mathcal E$ on a Noetherian scheme is quasi-isomorphic in the derived category to the complex of vector bundles :$\mathcal E_k \to \cdots \to \mathcal E_1 \to \mathcal E_0$ we can compute the total Chern class of $\mathcal E$ with

$$c(\mathcal E) = c(\mathcal E_0)c(\mathcal E_1)^{-1} \cdots c(\mathcal E_k)^{(-1)^k}$$

For example, this formula is useful for finding the Chern classes of the sheaf representing a subscheme of $X$. If we take the projective scheme $Z$ associated to the ideal $(xy,xz) \subseteq \mathbb C[x,y,z,w]$, then

$$c(\mathcal O_Z) = \frac{c(\mathcal O)c(\mathcal O(-3))}{c(\mathcal O(-2)\oplus \mathcal O(-2))}$$

since there is the resolution

$$0 \to \mathcal O(-3) \to \mathcal O(-2)\oplus\mathcal O(-2) \to \mathcal O \to \mathcal O_Z \to 0$$

over $\mathbb{CP}^3$.

== Bundle homomorphism vs. sheaf homomorphism ==
When vector bundles and locally free sheaves of finite constant rank are used interchangeably, care must be given to distinguish between bundle homomorphisms and sheaf homomorphisms. Specifically, given vector bundles $p: E \to X, \, q: F \to X$, by definition, a bundle homomorphism $\varphi: E \to F$ is a scheme morphism over $X$ (i.e., $p = q \circ \varphi$) such that, for each geometric point $x$ in $X$, $\varphi_x: p^{-1}(x) \to q^{-1}(x)$ is a linear map of rank independent of $x$. Thus, it induces the sheaf homomorphism $\widetilde{\varphi}: \mathcal E \to \mathcal F$ of constant rank between the corresponding locally free $\mathcal O_X$-modules (sheaves of dual sections). But there may be an $\mathcal O_X$-module homomorphism that does not arise this way; namely, those not having constant rank.

In particular, a subbundle $E \subseteq F$ is a subsheaf (i.e., $\mathcal E$ is a subsheaf of $\mathcal F$). But the converse can fail; for example, for an effective Cartier divisor $D$ on $X$, $\mathcal O_X(-D) \subseteq \mathcal O_X$ is a subsheaf but typically not a subbundle (since any line bundle has only two subbundles).

== The category of quasi-coherent sheaves ==
The quasi-coherent sheaves on any fixed scheme form an abelian category. Gabber showed that, in fact, the quasi-coherent sheaves on any scheme form a particularly well-behaved abelian category, a Grothendieck category. A quasi-compact quasi-separated scheme $X$ (such as an algebraic variety over a field) is determined up to isomorphism by the abelian category of quasi-coherent sheaves on $X$, by Rosenberg, generalizing a result of Gabriel.

== Coherent cohomology ==
The fundamental technical tool in algebraic geometry is the cohomology theory of coherent sheaves. Although it was introduced only in the 1950s, many earlier techniques of algebraic geometry are clarified by the language of sheaf cohomology applied to coherent sheaves. Broadly speaking, coherent sheaf cohomology can be viewed as a tool for producing functions with specified properties; sections of line bundles or of more general sheaves can be viewed as generalized functions. In complex analytic geometry, coherent sheaf cohomology also plays a foundational role.

Among the core results of coherent sheaf cohomology are results on finite-dimensionality of cohomology, results on the vanishing of cohomology in various cases, duality theorems such as Serre duality, relations between topology and algebraic geometry such as Hodge theory, and formulas for Euler characteristics of coherent sheaves such as the Riemann–Roch theorem.

== See also ==
- Picard group
- Divisor (algebraic geometry)
- Reflexive sheaf
- Quot scheme
- Twisted sheaf
- Essentially finite vector bundle
- Bundle of principal parts
- Gabriel–Rosenberg reconstruction theorem
- Pseudo-coherent sheaf
- Quasi-coherent sheaf on an algebraic stack
