= Localizing subcategory =

In mathematics, Serre and localizing subcategories form important classes of subcategories of an abelian category. Localizing subcategories are certain Serre subcategories. They are strongly linked to the notion of a quotient category.

== Serre subcategories ==
Let $\mathcal{A}$ be an abelian category. A non-empty full subcategory $\mathcal{C}$ is called a Serre subcategory (or also a dense subcategory), if for every short exact sequence $0\rightarrow A' \rightarrow A\rightarrow A''\rightarrow 0$ in $\mathcal{A}$ the object $A$ is in $\mathcal{C}$ if and only if the objects $A'$ and $A''$ belong to $\mathcal{C}$. In words: $\mathcal{C}$ is closed under subobjects, quotient objects and extensions.

Each Serre subcategory $\mathcal{C}$ of $\mathcal{A}$ is itself an abelian category, and the inclusion functor $\mathcal{C}\to\mathcal{A}$ is exact. The importance of this notion stems from the fact that kernels of exact functors between abelian categories are Serre subcategories, and that one can build (for locally small $\mathcal{A}$) the quotient category (in the sense of Gabriel, Grothendieck, Serre) $\mathcal{A}/\mathcal{C}$, which has the same objects as $\mathcal{A}$, is abelian, and comes with an exact functor (called the quotient functor) $T\colon\mathcal{A}\rightarrow\mathcal{A}/\mathcal{C}$ whose kernel is $\mathcal{C}$.

== Localizing subcategories ==
Let $\mathcal{A}$ be locally small. The Serre subcategory $\mathcal{C}$ is called localizing if the quotient functor $T\colon\mathcal{A}\rightarrow\mathcal{A}/\mathcal{C}$ has a right adjoint $S\colon\mathcal{A}/\mathcal{C}\rightarrow\mathcal{A}$. Since then $T$, as a left adjoint, preserves colimits, each localizing subcategory is closed under colimits. The functor $T$ (or sometimes $ST$) is also called the localization functor, and $S$ the section functor. The section functor is left-exact and fully faithful.

If the abelian category $\mathcal{A}$ is moreover cocomplete and has injective hulls (e.g. if it is a Grothendieck category), then a Serre subcategory $\mathcal{C}$ is localizing if and only if $\mathcal{C}$ is closed under arbitrary coproducts (a.k.a. direct sums). Hence the notion of a localizing subcategory is equivalent to the notion of a hereditary torsion class.

If $\mathcal{A}$ is a Grothendieck category and $\mathcal{C}$ a localizing subcategory, then $\mathcal{C}$ and the quotient category $\mathcal{A}/\mathcal{C}$ are again Grothendieck categories.

The Gabriel-Popescu theorem implies that every Grothendieck category is the quotient category of a module category $\operatorname{Mod}(R)$ (with $R$ a suitable ring) modulo a localizing subcategory.

== See also ==
- Giraud subcategory
