= Nine lemma =

Category theory lemma about commutative diagrams

In mathematics, the nine lemma (or 3×3 lemma) is a statement about commutative diagrams and exact sequences valid in the category of groups and any abelian category.

Consider the commutative diagram to the right. We have 6 statements:

- If all columns as well as the two bottom rows are exact, then the top row is exact.
- If all columns as well as the two top rows are exact, then the bottom row is exact.
- If all columns as well as the top and bottom rows are exact, and $A_2 \to C_2$ is the zero morphism, then the middle row is exact.
- By symmetry, exchanging the words "row" and "column" gives 3 more true statements.

The nine lemma can be proved by direct diagram chasing, or by applying the snake lemma (to the two bottom rows in the first case, and to the two top rows in the second case).

== Variants ==
The sharp nine lemma is slightly stronger.

Define a sequence $0 \to A \to B \to C \to 0$ "left exact" iff $0 \to A \to B \to C$ is exact. Then:

- If all columns as well as the two bottom rows are left exact, then the top row is left exact.
- If all columns as well as the two bottom rows are left exact, and the first column and the middle row are short exact, then the top row is exact.

In Mathematics Made Difficult, Linderholm offers a satirical view of the nine lemma:

Draw a noughts-and-crosses board... Do not fill it in with noughts and crosses... Instead, use curved arrows... Wave your hands about in complicated patterns over this board. Make some noughts, but not in the squares; put them at both ends of the horizontal and vertical lines. Make faces. You have now proved:

(a) the Nine Lemma
(b) the Sixteen Lemma
(c) the Twenty-five Lemma...

in which only (a) is a widely recognized theorem in homological algebra.
