= Tohoku (disambiguation) =

Tohoku may refer to:

- Tōhoku region, Japan
- Tōhoku, Aomori, Japan, a town
- Tohoku University, Japan
- Grothendieck's Tôhoku paper, a mathematics paper sometimes referred to as 'Tohoku'
- 2011 Tōhoku earthquake and tsunami, which affected the Tohoku region
