= Cogenerator =

Cogenerator may refer to:

- Cogeneration, simultaneous generation of heat and electricity
- Block heat and power plant, also known as a cogeneration unit
- Injective cogenerator, in mathematics
- More generally, cogenerator is the dual of a generator of a category.
- An operator in the dilation theorem for contraction semigroups
