= Character module =

In mathematics, especially in the area of abstract algebra, every module has an associated character module. Using the associated character module it is possible to investigate the properties of the original module. One of the main results discovered by Joachim Lambek shows that a module is flat if and only if the associated character module is injective.

== Definition ==
The group $(\mathbb{Q}/\mathbb{Z}, +)$, the group of rational numbers modulo $1$, can be considered as a $\mathbb{Z}$-module in the natural way. Let $M$ be an additive group which is also considered as a $\mathbb{Z}$-module. Then the group
$$M^* = \operatorname{Hom}_\mathbb{Z} (M, \mathbb{Q} / \mathbb{Z})$$
of $\mathbb{Z}$-homomorphisms from $M$ to $\mathbb{Q} / \mathbb{Z}$ is called the character group associated to $M$. The elements in this group are called characters. If $M$ is a left $R$-module over a ring $R$, then the character group $M^*$ is a right $R$-module and called the character module associated to $M$. The module action in the character module for $f \in \operatorname{Hom}_\mathbb{Z} (M, \mathbb{Q} / \mathbb{Z})$ and $r \in R$ is defined by $(f r)(m) = f(rm)$ for all $m \in M$. The character module can also be defined in the same way for right $R$-modules. In the literature also the notations $M', M^0$ and $M^+$ are used for character modules.

Let $M,N$ be left $R$-modules and $f \colon M \to N$ an $R$-homomorphism. Then the mapping $f^* \colon N^* \to M^*$ defined by $f^* (h) = h \circ f$ for all $h \in N^*$ is a right $R$-homomorphism. Character module formation is a contravariant functor from the category of left $R$-modules to the category of right $R$-modules.

== Motivation ==
The abelian group $\Q / \Z$ is divisible and therefore an injective $\Z$-module. Furthermore it has the following important property: Let $G$ be an abelian group and $g \in G$ nonzero. Then there exists a group homomorphism $f \colon G \to \Q / \Z$ with $f(g) \neq 0$. This says that $\Q / \Z$ is a cogenerator. With these properties one can show the main theorem of the theory of character modules:

Theorem (Lambek): A left module $M$ over a ring $R$ is flat if and only if the character module $M^*$ is an injective right $R$-module.

== Properties ==
Let $M$ be a left module over a ring $R$ and $M^*$ the associated character module.

- The module $M$ is flat if and only if $M^*$ is injective (Lambek's Theorem).
- If $M$ is free, then $M^*$ is an injective right $R$-module and $M^*$ is a direct product of copies of the right $R$-modules $R^*$.
- For every right $R$-module $N$ there is a free module $M$ such that $N$ is isomorphic to a submodule of $M^*$. With the previous property this module $M^*$ is injective, hence every right $R$-module is isomorphic to a submodule of an injective module. (Baer's Theorem)
- A left $R$-module $N$ is injective if and only if there exists a free $M$ such that $N$ is isomorphic to a direct summand of $M^*$.
- The module $M$ is injective if and only if it is a direct summand of a character module of a free module.
- If $N$ is a submodule of $M$, then $(M/N)^*$ is isomorphic to the submodule of $M^*$ which consists of all elements which annihilate $N$.
- Character module formation is a contravariant exact functor, i.e. it preserves exact sequences.
- Let $N$ be a right $R$-module. Then the modules $\operatorname{Hom}_R (N, M^*)$ and $(N \otimes_R M)^*$ are isomorphic as $\Z$-modules.
