= Topological half-exact functor =

Mathematical functor

In mathematics, a topological half-exact functor F is a functor from a fixed topological category (for example CW complexes or pointed spaces) to an abelian category (most frequently in applications, category of abelian groups or category of modules over a fixed ring) that has a following property: for each sequence of spaces, of the form:

X → Y → C(f)

where C(f) denotes a mapping cone, the sequence:

F(X) → F(Y) → F(C(f))

is exact. If F is a contravariant functor, it is half-exact if for each sequence of spaces as above, the sequence F(C(f)) → F(Y) → F(X) is exact.

Homology is an example of a half-exact functor, and cohomology (and generalized cohomology theories) are examples of contravariant half-exact functors. If B is any fibrant topological space, the (representable) functor F(X)=[X,B] is half-exact.
