= Barry Mitchell (mathematician) =

Canadian mathematician

- Born: June 25, 1933
- Died: January 26, 2021 (aged 87)
- Education: University of Toronto (BA, MA), Brown University (PhD)
- Scientific career
- Fields: Mathematics
- Thesis: Homological Tic Tac Toe (1960)
- Doctoral advisor: David Buchsbaum

Barry M. Mitchell (25 June 1933 – 26 January 2021) was a Canadian mathematician known for his contribution in category theory. He wrote one of the earliest books on category theory (1965).

He proved what is now known as Mitchell's embedding theorem, also known as Freyd-Mitchell embedding theorem or full imbedding theorem. This is a well-known result about abelian categories.

== Education and academic life ==
He graduated from the University of Toronto with both his bachelor's and master's degrees and obtained his Ph.D. at Brown University. His PhD advisor is David Alvin Buchsbaum and thesis title is Homological Tic Tac Toe.

He taught at Columbia University, Bowdoin College, and Rutgers University during his academic career. Among his works are two textbooks: Calculus Without Analytic Geometry and the pioneering Theory of Categories.

== Selected publications ==
- Barry Mitchell, Theory of Categories.
- Barry Mitchell, Calculus: Without Analytic Geometry.
- Barry Mitchell, The Full Imbedding Theorem, American Journal of Mathematics 86 3 (1964) 619–637
