= Localization of a category =

In mathematics, localization of a category consists of adding to a category inverse morphisms for some collection of morphisms, constraining them to become isomorphisms. This is formally similar to the process of localization of a ring; it in general makes objects isomorphic that were not so before. In homotopy theory, for example, there are many examples of mappings that are invertible up to homotopy; and so large classes of homotopy equivalent spaces. Calculus of fractions is another name for working in a localized category.

== Introduction and motivation ==
A category C consists of objects and morphisms between these objects. The morphisms reflect relations between the objects. In many situations, it is meaningful to replace C by another category C' in which certain morphisms are forced to be isomorphisms. This process is called localization.

For example, in the category of R-modules (for some fixed commutative ring R) the multiplication by a fixed element r of R is typically (i.e., unless r is a unit) not an isomorphism:

$$M \to M \quad m \mapsto r \cdot m.$$

The category that is most closely related to R-modules, but where this map is an isomorphism, turns out to be the category of $R[S^{-1}]$-modules. Here, $R[S^{-1}]$ is the localization of R with respect to the (multiplicatively closed) subset S consisting of all powers of r, $S = \{ 1, r, r^2, r^3, \dots\}.$ The expression "most closely related" is formalized by two conditions: first, there is a functor

$$\varphi: \text{Mod}_R \to \text{Mod}_{R[S^{-1}]} \quad M \mapsto M[S^{-1}]$$

sending any R-module to its localization with respect to S. Moreover, given any category C and any functor

$$F: \text{Mod}_R \to C$$

sending the multiplication map by r on any R-module (see above) to an isomorphism of C, there is a unique functor

$$G: \text{Mod}_{R[S^{-1}]} \to C$$

such that $F = G \circ \varphi$.

== Localization of categories ==
The above example of localization of R-modules is abstracted in the following definition. In this form, it applies in many more examples, some of which are sketched below.

Given a category C and some class W of morphisms in C, the localization C[W^{−1}] is another category which is obtained by inverting all the morphisms in W. More formally, it is characterized by a universal property: there is a localization functor C → C[W^{−1}] and, given another category D, a functor F: C → D factors uniquely through C[W^{−1}] if and only if F sends all arrows in W to isomorphisms.

Thus, the localization of the category is unique up to unique isomorphism of categories, provided that it exists. One construction of the localization is done by declaring that its objects are the same as those in C, but the morphisms are enhanced by adding a formal inverse for each morphism in W. Under suitable hypotheses on W, the morphisms from an object X to an object Y are given by roofs

$$X \stackrel f \leftarrow X' \rightarrow Y$$

(where X is an arbitrary object of C and f is in the given class W of morphisms), modulo certain equivalence relations. These relations turn the map going in the "wrong" direction into an inverse of f. This "calculus of fractions" can be seen as a generalization of the construction of rational numbers as equivalence classes of pairs of integers.

However, this procedure generally yields a proper class of morphisms between X and Y. Typically, the morphisms in a category are only allowed to form a set. Some authors simply ignore such set-theoretic issues.

=== Model categories ===
A rigorous construction of the localization of a category, avoiding these set-theoretic issues, was one of the initial reasons for the development of the theory of model categories. A model category is a category M in which there are three classes of maps: one of these classes is the class of weak equivalences. The homotopy category Ho(M) is the localization with respect to the weak equivalences. The axioms of a model category ensure that this localization can be defined without set-theoretical difficulties.

=== Alternative definition ===
Some authors also define a localization of a category C to be an idempotent and coaugmented functor. A coaugmented functor is a pair (L,l) where L:C → C is an endofunctor and l:Id → L is a natural transformation from the identity functor to L (called the coaugmentation). A coaugmented functor is idempotent if, for every object X, both maps L(l_{X}),l_{L(X)}:L(X) → LL(X) are isomorphisms. It can be proven that, in this case, both maps are equal.

This definition is related to the one given above as follows: applying the first definition, there is, in many situations, not only a canonical functor $C \to C[W^{-1}]$, but also a functor in the opposite direction

$$C[W^{-1}] \to C.$$

For example, modules over the localization $R[S^{-1}]$ of a ring R are also modules over R itself, giving a functor

$$\text{Mod}_{R[S^{-1}]} \to \text{Mod}_R.$$

In this case, the composition

$$L : C \to C[W^{-1}] \to C$$

is a localization of C in the sense of an idempotent and coaugmented functor.

== Examples ==
=== Serre's C-theory ===
Serre introduced the idea of working in homotopy theory modulo some class C of abelian groups. This meant that groups A and B were treated as isomorphic, if for example A/B lay in C.

=== Module theory ===
In the theory of modules over a commutative ring R, when R has Krull dimension ≥ 2, it can be useful to treat modules M and N as pseudo-isomorphic if M/N has support of codimension at least two. This idea is much used in Iwasawa theory.

=== Derived categories ===
The derived category of an abelian category is much used in homological algebra. It is the localization of the category of chain complexes (up to homotopy) with respect to the quasi-isomorphisms.

=== Quotients of abelian categories ===
Given an abelian category A and a Serre subcategory B, one can define the quotient category A/B, which is an abelian category equipped with an exact functor from A to A/B that is essentially surjective and has kernel B. This quotient category can be constructed as a localization of A by the class of morphisms whose kernel and cokernel are both in B.

=== Abelian varieties up to isogeny ===
An isogeny from an abelian variety A to another one B is a surjective morphism with finite kernel. Some theorems on abelian varieties require the idea of abelian variety up to isogeny for their convenient statement. For example, given an abelian subvariety A_{1} of A, there is another subvariety A_{2} of A such that

A_{1} × A_{2}

is isogenous to A (Poincaré's reducibility theorem: see for example Abelian Varieties by David Mumford). To call this a direct sum decomposition, we should work in the category of abelian varieties up to isogeny.

== Related concepts ==
The localization of a topological space, introduced by Dennis Sullivan, produces another topological space whose homology is a localization of the homology of the original space.

A much more general concept from homotopical algebra, including as special cases both the localization of spaces and of categories, is the Bousfield localization of a model category. Bousfield localization forces certain maps to become weak equivalences, which is in general weaker than forcing them to become isomorphisms.

== See also ==
- Simplicial localization
