= AB5 category =

In mathematics, Alexander Grothendieck (1957) in his "Tôhoku paper" introduced a sequence of axioms of various kinds of categories enriched over the symmetric monoidal category of abelian groups. Abelian categories are sometimes called AB2 categories, according to the axiom (AB2). AB3 categories are abelian categories possessing arbitrary coproducts (hence, by the existence of quotients in abelian categories, also all colimits). AB5 categories are the AB3 categories in which filtered colimits of exact sequences are exact. Grothendieck categories are the AB5 categories with a generator.
