= Jean Giraud (mathematician) =

French mathematician (1936–2007)

- Born: 2 February 1936
- Died: 28 March 2007 (aged 71)
- Education: University of Paris
- Known for: Giraud subcategory Giraud's axioms Gerbe; Sieve; Stacks; Twisted sheaf
- Scientific career
- Fields: Mathematics
- Doctoral advisor: Alexander Grothendieck

Jean Giraud (French: [ʒiʁo]; 2 February 1936 – 27 or 28 March 2007) was a French mathematician, a student of Alexander Grothendieck. His research focused on non-abelian cohomology and the theory of topoi. In particular, he authored the book Cohomologie non-abélienne (Springer, 1971) and proved the theorem that bears his name, which gives a characterization of a Grothendieck topos.

From 1969 to 1989, he was a professor at École normale supérieure de Saint-Cloud.

From 1993 to 1994, he was deputy director for research of École normale supérieure de Lyon, where he was made interim director in 1994 and director from 1995 to 2000.

== See also ==
- Fibred category
