= Subterminal object =

In category theory, a branch of mathematics, a subterminal object is an object X of a category C with the property that every object of C has at most one morphism into X. If X is subterminal, then the pair of identity morphisms (1_{X}, 1_{X}) makes X into the product of X and X. If C has a terminal object 1, then an object X is subterminal if and only if it is a subobject of 1, hence the name. The category of categories with subterminal objects and functors preserving them is not accessible.
