= Simplicial localization =

Category theory

In category theory, a branch of mathematics, the simplicial localization of a category C with respect to a class W of morphisms of C is a simplicial category LC whose $\pi_0$ is the localization $C[W^{-1}]$ of C with respect to W; that is, $\pi_0 LC(x, y) = C[W^{-1}](x, y)$ for any objects x, y in C. The notion is due to Dwyer and Kan.
