= Grothendieck's Tôhoku paper =

1957 mathematics paper by Alexander Grothendieck

The mathematics article "Sur quelques points d'algèbre homologique" by Alexander Grothendieck, now often referred to as the Tôhoku paper, was published in 1957 in the Tôhoku Mathematical Journal. It revolutionized the subject of homological algebra, a purely algebraic aspect of algebraic topology. It removed the need to distinguish the cases of modules over a ring and sheaves of abelian groups over a topological space.

== Background ==
Material in the paper dates from Grothendieck's year at the University of Kansas in 1955–56. Research there allowed him to put homological algebra on an axiomatic basis, by introducing the abelian category concept.

That same year, a textbook treatment of homological algebra, Homological Algebra by Henri Cartan and Samuel Eilenberg, appeared. Grothendieck's work was largely independent of it; however, his abelian category concept had at least partially been anticipated by others. David Buchsbaum in his doctoral thesis written under Eilenberg had introduced a notion of "exact category" close to the abelian category concept (needing only direct sums to be identical); and had formulated the idea of "enough injectives". The Tôhoku paper contains an argument to prove that a Grothendieck category (a particular type of abelian category, the name coming later) has enough injectives; the author indicated that the proof was of a standard type. In showing by this means that categories of sheaves of abelian groups admitted injective resolutions, Grothendieck went beyond the theory available in Cartan and Eilenberg's book to prove the existence of a cohomology theory in generality.

== Later developments ==
After the Gabriel–Popescu theorem of 1964, it was known that every Grothendieck category is a quotient category of a module category.

The Tôhoku paper also introduced the Grothendieck spectral sequence associated to the composition of derived functors. In further reconsideration of the foundations of homological algebra, Grothendieck introduced and developed with Jean-Louis Verdier the derived category concept. The initial motivation, as announced by Grothendieck at the 1958 International Congress of Mathematicians, was to formulate results on coherent duality, now going under the name "Grothendieck duality".
