= Mathematics Made Difficult =

Book by Carl E. Linderholm

- Author: Carl E. Linderholm
- Subject: Mathematics, Satire
- Publisher: World Publishing
- Publication date: 1972
- Pages: 207
- ISBN: 978-0-529-04552-2
- OCLC: 279066
- Dewey Decimal: 510

Mathematics Made Difficult is a book by Carl E. Linderholm that uses advanced mathematical methods to prove results normally shown using elementary proofs. Although the aim is largely satirical, it also shows the non-trivial mathematics behind operations normally considered obvious, such as numbering, counting, and factoring integers. Linderholm discusses these seemingly obvious ideas using concepts like categories and monoids.

As an example, the proof that 2 is a prime number starts:

It is easily seen that the only numbers between 0 and 2, including 0 but excluding 2, are 0 and 1. Thus the remainder left by any number on division by 2 is either 0 or 1. Hence the quotient ring Z/2Z, where 2Z is the ideal in Z generated by 2, has only the elements [0] and [1], where these are the images of 0 and 1 under the canonical quotient map. Since [1] must be the unit of this ring, every element of this ring except [0] is a unit, and the ring is a field ...
