= Generator (category theory) =

In mathematics, more specifically category theory, a generator (otherwise known as a separator), or generating family (resp. separating family) is a collection of objects that "see enough" of the category that their perspective is enough to determine the morphisms in the category.

== Definition ==
A family $\mathcal{G}$ of objects in a category $C$ is called a generating family if for every pair of morphisms $f, g\colon A \to B$ with $f \neq g$ there is an object $G \in \mathcal{G}$ and morphism $e\colon G \to A$ witnessing the difference, that is $f \circ e \neq g \circ e$.

If this family is a single object $\mathcal{G}=\{G\}$ we say that $G$ is a generator. Note that this definition then reduces to saying that the functor $\text{Hom}(G,-)\colon C \to \textbf{Set}$ is faithful.

The dual of this structure is then referred to as a cogenerator/cogenerating family.

== Characterisations ==
Some older texts may use a different definition by Grothendieck. When he was developing his theory of Grothendieck categories he used a definition in terms of being able to use $\mathcal{G}$ to determine subobjects. However these definitions coincide for many practical applications in particular when working in a topos.

The usage of the word "generator" evokes the idea that we can generate the category using these objects. This is true in the following sense.

If our category is locally small with all small coproducts then a set $\mathcal{G}$ is generating if and only if the map

$$\coprod_{g_i \in \mathcal{G}, f\colon g_i \to X} g_i \to X$$

That acts as f on the part of the coproduct with index f, is an epimorphism. This shows that $\mathcal{G}$ is generating if and only if every object X admits an epimorphism from some coproduct of elements of $\mathcal{G}$

If, in addition, every epimorphism in our category is regular this means that every object of our category is generated by colimits of objects in $\mathcal{G}$. This is the case in an Abelian category for example.

== Projective Generators ==
Projective generators (and their dual injective cogenerators) are often very powerful tools to have when doing algebra in a category. For example, if an abelian category has small coproducts and a compact projective generator P then it is in fact equivalent to the category of modules over the ring $\text{End}(P)^{op}$. This is then used to prove Mitchell's embedding theorem. This fact is generally useful as compactness, projectiveness and being a generating family are stable under reasonable sums and taking summands so many categories that aren't equivalent to R-mod can be approximated by R-mod for some R by limiting the "size" of objects and taking the sum of all the "smaller" projective generators

Using the characterisation in terms of projections from coproducts, having a family of projective generators along with the existence of coproducts guarantees the category has "enough projectives".

If we have a category with an injective cogenerator $I$ taking the "dualising" functor $\text{Hom}(-,I)$ is faithful and has other desirable properties coming from the injectivity. Taking $I$ to be $\mathbb Q / \mathbb Z$ we get the idea of a Character module, a concept useful for studying modules over arbitrary rings, Similarly taking $I$ to be the circle group we obtain the theory of Pontryagin duality.

== Examples ==
- In the category of abelian groups, the group of integers $\mathbb Z$ is a generator (in fact a projective one): If f and g are different, then there is an element $x \in X$, such that $f(x) \neq g(x)$. Hence the map $\mathbb Z \rightarrow X,$ $n \mapsto n \cdot x$ suffices.
- In that same category the group $\mathbb Q / \mathbb Z$ is a cogenerator (in fact an injective one): Supposing f and g disagree at x if we can find a map sending $f(x)-g(x)$ to something nonzero in $\mathbb Q / \mathbb Z$ we can witness the difference. As $\mathbb Q / \mathbb Z$ is a divisible group we just need to determine what happens on the cyclic subgroup generated by this element and then we can extend. This is easy to do by sending it anywhere if it has infinite order and sending it to $1/n$ if it has order n.
- Similarly to $\mathbb Z$, the one-point set is a generator for the category of sets. In fact, any nonempty set is a generator.
- In the category of sets, any set with at least two elements is a cogenerator.
- In the category of modules over a ring R, a generator in a finite direct sum with itself contains an isomorphic copy of R as a direct summand. Consequently, a generator module is faithful, i.e. has zero annihilator.
- Using the Tietze extension theorem one can show that the unit interval is an injective cogenerator in the category of compact Hausdorff spaces.
