= Exact category =

In mathematics, specifically in category theory, an exact category is a category equipped with short exact sequences. The concept is due to Daniel Quillen and is designed to encapsulate the properties of short exact sequences in abelian categories without requiring that morphisms actually possess kernels and cokernels, which is necessary for the usual definition of such a sequence.

== Definition ==
An exact category E is an additive category possessing a class E of "short exact sequences": triples of objects connected by arrows

$$M' \to M \to M''\$$

satisfying the following axioms inspired by the properties of short exact sequences in an abelian category:

- E is closed under isomorphisms and contains the canonical ("split exact") sequences:

$$M' \to M' \oplus M''\to M'';$$

- Suppose $M \to M''$ occurs as the second arrow of a sequence in E (it is an admissible epimorphism) and $N \to M''$ is any arrow in E. Then their pullback exists and its projection to $N$ is also an admissible epimorphism. Dually, if $M' \to M$ occurs as the first arrow of a sequence in E (it is an admissible monomorphism) and $M' \to N$ is any arrow, then their pushout exists and its coprojection from $N$ is also an admissible monomorphism. (We say that the admissible epimorphisms are "stable under pullback", resp. the admissible monomorphisms are "stable under pushout".);
- Admissible monomorphisms are kernels of their corresponding admissible epimorphisms, and dually. The composition of two admissible monomorphisms is admissible (likewise admissible epimorphisms);
- Suppose $M \to M''$ is a map in E which admits a kernel in E, and suppose $N \to M$ is any map such that the composition $N \to M \to M''$ is an admissible epimorphism. Then so is $M \to M''.$ Dually, if $M' \to M$ admits a cokernel and $M \to N$ is such that $M' \to M \to N$ is an admissible monomorphism, then so is $M' \to M.$

Admissible monomorphisms are generally denoted $\rightarrowtail$ and admissible epimorphisms are denoted $\twoheadrightarrow.$ These axioms are not minimal; in fact, the last one has been shown by Bernhard Keller (1990) to be redundant.

One can speak of an exact functor between exact categories exactly as in the case of exact functors of abelian categories: an exact functor $F$ from an exact category D to another one E is an additive functor such that if

$$M' \rightarrowtail M \twoheadrightarrow M''$$

is exact in D, then

$$F(M') \rightarrowtail F(M) \twoheadrightarrow F(M'')$$

is exact in E. If D is a subcategory of E, it is an exact subcategory if the inclusion functor is fully faithful and exact.

== Motivation ==
Exact categories come from abelian categories in the following way. Suppose A is abelian and let E be any strictly full additive subcategory which is closed under taking extensions in the sense that given an exact sequence

$$0 \to M' \to M \to M'' \to 0\$$

in A, then if $M', M''$ are in E, so is $M$. We can take the class E to be simply the sequences in E which are exact in A; that is,

$$M' \to M \to M''\$$

is in E iff

$$0 \to M' \to M \to M'' \to 0\$$

is exact in A. Then E is an exact category in the above sense. We verify the axioms:

- E is closed under isomorphisms and contains the split exact sequences: these are true by definition, since in an abelian category, any sequence isomorphic to an exact one is also exact, and since the split sequences are always exact in A.
- Admissible epimorphisms (respectively, admissible monomorphisms) are stable under pullbacks (resp. pushouts): given an exact sequence of objects in E,

$$0 \to M' \xrightarrow{f} M \to M'' \to 0,\$$

and a map $N \to M''$ with $N$ in E, one verifies that the following sequence is also exact; since E is stable under extensions, this means that $M \times_{M''} N$ is in E:

$$0 \to M' \xrightarrow{(f,0)} M \times_{M''} N \to N \to 0.\$$

- Every admissible monomorphism is the kernel of its corresponding admissible epimorphism, and vice versa: this is true as morphisms in A, and E is a full subcategory.
- If $M \to M''$ admits a kernel in E and if $N \to M$ is such that $N \to M \to M''$ is an admissible epimorphism, then so is $M \to M''$: See Quillen (1972).

Conversely, if E is any exact category, we can take A to be the category of left-exact functors from E into the category of abelian groups, which is itself abelian and in which E is a natural subcategory (via the Yoneda embedding, since Hom is left exact), stable under extensions, and in which a sequence is in E if and only if it is exact in A.

== Examples ==
- Any abelian category is exact in the obvious way, according to the construction of #Motivation.
- A less trivial example is the category Ab_{tf} of torsion-free abelian groups, which is a strictly full subcategory of the (abelian) category Ab of all abelian groups. It is closed under extensions: if

$$0 \to A \to B \to C \to 0\$$

is a short exact sequence of abelian groups in which $A, C$ are torsion-free, then $B$ is seen to be torsion-free by the following argument: if $b$ is a torsion element, then its image in $C$ is zero, since $C$ is torsion-free. Thus $b$ lies in the kernel of the map to $C$, which is $A$, but that is also torsion-free, so $b = 0$. By the construction of #Motivation, Ab_{tf} is an exact category; some examples of exact sequences in it are:

$$0 \to \mathbb{Z} \xrightarrow{\left(\begin{smallmatrix} 1 \\ 2 \end{smallmatrix}\right)} \mathbb{Z}^2 \xrightarrow{(-2, 1)} \mathbb{Z} \to 0,$$
$$0 \to d\Omega^0(S^1) \to \Omega^1_c(S^1) \to H^1_{\text{dR}}(S^1) \to 0,$$

where the last example is inspired by de Rham cohomology ($\Omega^1_c(S^1)$ and $d\Omega^0(S^1)$ are the closed and exact differential forms on the circle group); in particular, it is known that the cohomology group is isomorphic to the real numbers. This category is not abelian.

- The following example is in some sense complementary to the above. Let Ab_{t} be the category of abelian groups with torsion (and also the zero group). This is additive and a strictly full subcategory of Ab again. It is even easier to see that it is stable under extensions: if

$$0 \to A \to B \to C \to 0\$$

is an exact sequence in which $A, C$ have torsion, then $B$ naturally has all the torsion elements of $A$. Thus it is an exact category.
