= Subcategory =

Category whose objects and morphisms are inside a bigger category

In mathematics, specifically category theory, a subcategory of a category $\mathcal{C}$ is a category $\mathcal{S}$ whose objects are objects in $\mathcal{C}$ and whose morphisms are morphisms in $\mathcal{C}$ with the same identities and composition of morphisms. Intuitively, a subcategory of $\mathcal{C}$ is a category obtained from $\mathcal{C}$ by "removing" some of its objects and arrows.

== Formal definition ==
Let $\mathcal{C}$ be a category. A subcategory $\mathcal{S}$ of $\mathcal{C}$ is given by

- a subcollection of objects of $\mathcal{C}$, denoted $\operatorname{ob}(\mathcal{S})$,
- a subcollection of morphisms of $\mathcal{C}$, denoted $\operatorname{mor}(\mathcal{S})$.

such that

- for every $X$ in $\operatorname{ob}(\mathcal{S})$, the identity morphism id_{$X$} is in $\operatorname{mor}(\mathcal{S})$,
- for every morphism $f:X\to Y$ in $\operatorname{mor}(\mathcal{S})$, both the source $X$ and the target $Y$ are in $\operatorname{ob}(\mathcal{S})$,
- for every pair of morphisms $f$ and $g$ in $\operatorname{mor}(\mathcal{S})$ the composite $f\circ g$ is in $\operatorname{mor}(\mathcal{S})$ whenever it is defined.

These conditions ensure that $\mathcal{S}$ is a category in its own right: its collection of objects is $\operatorname{ob}(\mathcal{S})$, its collection of morphisms is $\operatorname{mor}(\mathcal{S})$, and its identities and composition are as in $\mathcal{C}$. There is an obvious faithful functor $I:\mathcal{S}\to\mathcal{C}$, called the inclusion functor which takes objects and morphisms to themselves.

Let $\mathcal{S}$ be a subcategory of a category $\mathcal{C}$. We say that $\mathcal{S}$ is a full subcategory of $\mathcal{C}$ if for each pair of objects $X$ and $Y$ of $\mathcal{S}$,

$$\mathrm{Hom}_\mathcal{S}(X,Y)=\mathrm{Hom}_\mathcal{C}(X,Y).$$

A full subcategory is one that includes all morphisms in $\mathcal{C}$ between objects of $\mathcal{S}$. For any collection of objects $A$ in $\mathcal{C}$, there is a unique full subcategory of $\mathcal{C}$ whose objects are those in $A$.

== Examples ==
- The category of finite sets forms a full subcategory of the category of sets.
- The category whose objects are sets and whose morphisms are bijections forms a non-full subcategory of the category of sets.
- The category of abelian groups forms a full subcategory of the category of groups.
- The category of rings (whose morphisms are unit-preserving ring homomorphisms) forms a non-full subcategory of the category of rngs.
- For a field $K$, the category of $K$-vector spaces forms a full subcategory of the category of (left or right) $K$-modules.

== Embeddings ==
Given a subcategory $\mathcal{S}$ of $\mathcal{C}$, the inclusion functor $I:\mathcal{S}\to\mathcal{C}$ is both a faithful functor and injective on objects. It is full if and only if $\mathcal{S}$ is a full subcategory.

Some authors define an embedding to be a full and faithful functor. Such a functor is necessarily injective on objects up to isomorphism. For instance, the Yoneda embedding is an embedding in this sense.

Some authors define an embedding to be a full and faithful functor that is injective on objects.

Other authors define a functor to be an embedding if it is faithful and injective on objects. Equivalently, $F$ is an embedding if it is injective on morphisms. A functor $F$ is then called a full embedding if it is a full functor and an embedding.

With the definitions of the previous paragraph, for any (full) embedding $F:\mathcal{B}\to\mathcal{C}$ the image of $F$ is a (full) subcategory $\mathcal{S}$ of $\mathcal{C}$, and $F$ induces an isomorphism of categories between $\mathcal{B}$ and $\mathcal{S}$. If $F$ is a full and faithful functor but not necessarily injective on objects, then the image of $F$ is equivalent to $\mathcal{B}$.

In some categories, one can also speak of morphisms of the category being embeddings.

== Types of subcategories ==
A subcategory $\mathcal{S}$ of $\mathcal{C}$ is said to be isomorphism-closed or replete if every isomorphism $k:X\to Y$ in $\mathcal{C}$ such that $Y$ is in $\mathcal{S}$ also belongs to $\mathcal{S}$. An isomorphism-closed full subcategory is said to be strictly full.

A subcategory of $\mathcal{C}$ is wide or lluf (a term first posed by Peter Freyd) if it contains all the objects of $\mathcal{C}$. A wide subcategory is typically not full: the only wide full subcategory of a category is that category itself.

A Serre subcategory is a non-empty full subcategory $\mathcal{S}$ of an abelian category $\mathcal{C}$ such that for all short exact sequences

$$0\to M'\to M\to M''\to 0$$

in $\mathcal{C}$, $M$ belongs to $\mathcal{S}$ if and only if both $M'$ and $M''$ do. This notion arises from Serre's C-theory.

== See also ==
- Reflective subcategory
- Exact category, a full subcategory closed under extensions.
