= Subobject =

Mathematical concept in category theory

In category theory, a branch of mathematics, a subobject of an object $A$ in a category is a monomorphism into $A$, “up to isomorphism”. In various categories of mathematical structures, this coincides with the standard notion of a substructure of the given type of structure. For example, subobjects correspond to subsets in the category of sets, to subgroups in the category of groups, to subrings in the category of rings, etc.

The dual concept to a subobject is a quotient object. This generalizes concepts such as quotient sets, quotient groups, quotient rings, etc.

== Definitions ==
Let $A$ be an object of a category $\mathcal{C}$. The monomorphisms into $A$ are equipped with a canonical preorder: for $u : S \hookrightarrow A$ and $v : T \hookrightarrow A$, we put $u \leq v$ when $u$ factors through $v$, i.e., there exists $\phi : S \to T$ such that $u = v \circ \phi$. When this is the case, $\phi$ is unique because $v$ is a monomorphism, and $\phi$ is also a monomorphism because $u$ is.

This preorder gives rise to an equivalence relation $\equiv$, namely, $u \equiv v$ when $u \leq v$ and $v \leq u$. When this holds, the unique morphism $\phi$ such that $u = v \circ \phi$ and the unique morphism $\phi'$ such that $v = u \circ \phi'$ are isomorphisms inverse to each other (by uniqueness of the factorizations $u = u \circ \operatorname{id}$, $v = v \circ \operatorname{id}$).

The subobjects of $A$ are defined by quotienting monomorphisms into $A$ by this equivalence relation. This means that a subobject is represented by a monomorphism into $A$, with the provision that two such monomorphisms which factor through each other are considered equal as subobjects. The subobjects are equipped with the partial order induced by the preorder $\leq$ on monomorphisms into $A$.

The collection of subobjects of an object may in fact be a proper class. If the subobject collection of every object is a set, the category $\mathcal{C}$ is called well-powered (or, rarely, locally small, but this clashes with a different usage of the term locally small, namely that the morphisms between any two objects form a set).

If $\mathcal{C}$ has pullbacks, then a morphism $f : A \to B$ gives rise to an order-preserving map from subobjects of $B$ to subobjects of $A$, defined at the level of representing monomorphisms by pulling back along $f$. (Note: It can be checked by diagram chasing that a pullback of a monomorphism is a monomorphism, that pullbacks of equivalent monomorphisms are equivalent, and that this respects the order.) If $\mathcal{C}$ is additionally well-powered, this gives rise to a subobject functor $\operatorname{Sub}_\mathcal{C} : \mathcal{C}^\operatorname{op} \to \operatorname{Poset}$.

The concept of a quotient object is formally dual: a quotient object of $A$ is an epimorphism from $A$, with the provision that two such epimorphisms which factor through each other are considered equal as quotient objects.

== Examples ==
In the category of sets, the monomorphisms are the injective functions. Given a subset $S \subseteq A$, the inclusion map $S \hookrightarrow A$ defines a subobject, and every subobject is of this form because two monomorphisms into $A$ are equivalent if and only if they have the same image. The subobject functor is the contravariant powerset functor $\mathcal{P} : \operatorname{Set}^\operatorname{op} \to \operatorname{Poset}$, which sends a set $A$ to its power set $\mathcal{P}(A)$ partially ordered by inclusion, and sends a function $f : A \to B$ to the function $\mathcal{P}(B) \to \mathcal{P}(A)$ that maps a subset $S \subseteq B$ to its inverse image $f^{-1}(S) \subseteq A$.

There are many other categories where subobjects correspond to a standard notion, for instance:

- A subobject of a group is a subgroup,
- A subobject of a ring is a subring,
- A subobject of a module is a submodule.

Likewise,

- A quotient object of a set is a quotient set,
- A quotient object of a group is a quotient group,
- A quotient object of a module is a quotient module.

A subobject of a terminal object is called a subterminal object.

== Properties ==
- There is always a greatest subobject of $A$, represented by the identity morphism $\operatorname{id} : A \to A$.
- In an elementary topos, the poset of subobjects of any object is a Heyting algebra.

== Regular subobjects ==
A regular subobject is a subobject represented by a regular monomorphism, namely a morphism (automatically a monomorphism) which arises as the equalizer of two parallel morphisms. Dually, a regular quotient object is represented by a regular epimorphism, namely a coequalizer of two parallel morphisms.

In some categories, the categorical notion of subobject does not concord with the usual notion whereas the categorical notion of regular subobject does. For example, in the category of rings, the inclusion $\mathbb{Z} \hookrightarrow \mathbb{Q}$ is an epimorphism but is not the quotient ring of $\mathbb{Z}$ by an ideal, whereas regular subobjects correspond to quotient rings.

Another example is the category of topological spaces, where regular subobjects of $X$ correspond to subspaces of $X$ because the regular monomorphisms are the subspace embeddings, whereas the monomorphisms are all injective continuous functions, and so subobjects of $X$ correspond to subsets of $X$ with a topology refining the subspace topology. Similarly, regular quotient objects of $X$ correspond to quotient spaces of $X$ whereas quotient objects in general correspond to quotient sets of $X$ with a topology coarser than the quotient topology.

== See also ==
- Subobject classifier
- Subquotient
