= Pre-abelian category =

Category

In mathematics, specifically in category theory, a pre-abelian category is an additive category that has all kernels and cokernels.

Spelled out in more detail, this means that a category C is pre-abelian if:

1. C is preadditive, that is enriched over the monoidal category of abelian groups (equivalently, all hom-sets in C are abelian groups and composition of morphisms is bilinear);
2. C has all finite products (equivalently, all finite coproducts); note that because C is also preadditive, finite products are the same as finite coproducts, making them biproducts;
3. given any morphism f: A → B in C, the equaliser of f and the zero morphism from A to B exists (this is by definition the kernel of f), as does the coequaliser (this is by definition the cokernel of f).

Note that the zero morphism in item 3 can be identified as the identity element of the hom-set Hom(A,B), which is an abelian group by item 1; or as the unique morphism A → 0 → B, where 0 is a zero object, guaranteed to exist by item 2.

== Examples ==
The original example of an additive category is the category Ab of abelian groups. Ab is preadditive because it is a closed monoidal category, the biproduct in Ab is the finite direct sum, the kernel is inclusion of the ordinary kernel from group theory and the cokernel is the quotient map onto the ordinary cokernel from group theory.

Other common examples:

- The category of (left) modules over a ring R, in particular:
  - the category of vector spaces over a field K.
- The category of (Hausdorff) abelian topological groups.
- The category of Banach spaces.
- The category of Fréchet spaces.
- The category of (Hausdorff) bornological spaces.

These will give you an idea of what to think of; for more examples, see abelian category (every abelian category is pre-abelian).

== Elementary properties ==
Every pre-abelian category is of course an additive category, and many basic properties of these categories are described under that subject. This article concerns itself with the properties that hold specifically because of the existence of kernels and cokernels.

Although kernels and cokernels are special kinds of equalisers and coequalisers, a pre-abelian category actually has all equalisers and coequalisers. We simply construct the equaliser of two morphisms f and g as the kernel of their difference g − f ; similarly, their coequaliser is the cokernel of their difference. (The alternative term "difference kernel" for binary equalisers derives from this fact.) Since pre-abelian categories have all finite products and coproducts (the biproducts) and all binary equalisers and coequalisers (as just described), then by a general theorem of category theory, they have all finite limits and colimits. That is, pre-abelian categories are finitely complete.

The existence of both kernels and cokernels gives a notion of image and coimage. We can define these as

im f := ker coker f;
coim f := coker ker f.

That is, the image is the kernel of the cokernel, and the coimage is the cokernel of the kernel.

Note that this notion of image may not correspond to the usual notion of image, or range, of a function, even assuming that the morphisms in the category are functions. For example, in the category of topological abelian groups, the image of a morphism actually corresponds to the inclusion of the closure of the range of the function. For this reason, people will often distinguish the meanings of the two terms in this context, using "image" for the abstract categorical concept and "range" for the elementary set-theoretic concept.

In many common situations, such as the category of sets, where images and coimages exist, their objects are isomorphic. Put more precisely, we have a factorisation of f: A → B as

A → C → I → B,

where the morphism on the left is the coimage, the morphism on the right is the image, and the morphism in the middle (called the parallel of f) is an isomorphism.

In a pre-abelian category, this is not necessarily true. The factorisation shown above does always exist, but the parallel might not be an isomorphism. In fact, the parallel of f is an isomorphism for every morphism f if and only if the pre-abelian category is an abelian category. An example of a non-abelian, pre-abelian category is, once again, the category of topological abelian groups. As remarked, the image is the inclusion of the closure of the range; however, the coimage is a quotient map onto the range itself. Thus, the parallel is the inclusion of the range into its closure, which is not an isomorphism unless the range was already closed.

== Exact functors ==
Recall that all finite limits and colimits exist in a pre-abelian category. In general category theory, a functor is called left exact if it preserves all finite limits and right exact if it preserves all finite colimits. (A functor is simply exact if it's both left exact and right exact.)

In a pre-abelian category, exact functors can be described in particularly simple terms. First, recall that an additive functor is a functor F: C → D between preadditive categories that acts as a group homomorphism on each hom-set. Then it turns out that a functor between pre-abelian categories is left exact if and only if it is additive and preserves all kernels, and it's right exact if and only if it's additive and preserves all cokernels.

Note that an exact functor, because it preserves both kernels and cokernels, preserves all images and coimages. Exact functors are most useful in the study of abelian categories, where they can be applied to exact sequences.

== Maximal exact structure ==
On every pre-abelian category $\mathcal A$ there exists an exact structure $\mathcal{E}_{\text{max}}$ that is maximal in the sense that it contains every other exact structure. The exact structure $\mathcal{E}_{\text{max}}$ consists of precisely those kernel-cokernel pairs $(f,g)$ where $f$ is a semi-stable kernel and $\mathcal g$ is a semi-stable cokernel. Here, $f:X\rightarrow Y$ is a semi-stable kernel if it is a kernel and for each morphism $h:X\rightarrow Z$ in the pushout diagram

$\begin{array}{ccc} X & \xrightarrow{f} & Y \\ \downarrow_{h} & & \downarrow_{h'}\\ Z & \xrightarrow{f'} & Q \end{array}$

the morphism $f'$ is again a kernel. $g: X\rightarrow Y$ is a semi-stable cokernel if it is a cokernel and for every morphism $h: Z\rightarrow Y$ in the pullback diagram

$\begin{array}{ccc} P & \xrightarrow{g'} & Z \\ \downarrow_{h'} & & \downarrow_{h}\\ X & \xrightarrow{g} & Y \end{array}$

the morphism $g'$ is again a cokernel.

A pre-abelian category $\mathcal A$ is quasi-abelian if and only if all kernel-cokernel pairs form an exact structure. An example for which this is not the case is the category of (Hausdorff) bornological spaces.

The result is also valid for additive categories that are not pre-abelian but Karoubian.

== Special cases ==
- An abelian category is a pre-abelian category such that every monomorphism and epimorphism is normal.
- A quasi-abelian category is a pre-abelian category in which kernels are stable under pushouts and cokernels are stable under pullbacks.
- A semi-abelian category is a pre-abelian category in which for each morphism $f$ the induced morphism $\overline{f}:\operatorname{coim}f\rightarrow\operatorname{im}f$ is always a monomorphism and an epimorphism.

The pre-abelian categories most commonly studied are in fact abelian categories; for example, Ab is an abelian category. Pre-abelian categories that are not abelian appear for instance in functional analysis.
