= Quasi-abelian category =

In mathematics, specifically in category theory, a quasi-abelian category is a pre-abelian category in which the pushout of a kernel along arbitrary morphisms is again a kernel and, dually, the pullback of a cokernel along arbitrary morphisms is again a cokernel.

A quasi-abelian category is an exact category.

== Definition ==
Let $\mathcal A$ be a pre-abelian category. A morphism $f$ is a kernel (a cokernel) if there exists a morphism $g$ such that $f$ is a kernel (cokernel) of $g$. The category $\mathcal A$ is quasi-abelian if for every kernel $f: X\rightarrow Y$ and every morphism $h: X\rightarrow Z$ in the pushout diagram

$\begin{array}{ccc} X & \xrightarrow{f} & Y \\ \downarrow_{h} & & \downarrow_{h'}\\ Z & \xrightarrow{f'} & Q \end{array}$

the morphism $f'$ is again a kernel and, dually, for every cokernel $g: X\rightarrow Y$ and every morphism $h: Z\rightarrow Y$ in the pullback diagram

$\begin{array}{ccc} P & \xrightarrow{g'} & Z \\ \downarrow_{h'} & & \downarrow_{h}\\ X & \xrightarrow{g} & Y \end{array}$

the morphism $g'$ is again a cokernel.

Equivalently, a quasi-abelian category is a pre-abelian category in which the system of all kernel-cokernel pairs forms an exact structure.

Given a pre-abelian category, those kernels, which are stable under arbitrary pushouts, are sometimes called the semi-stable kernels. Dually, cokernels, which are stable under arbitrary pullbacks, are called semi-stable cokernels.

== Properties ==
Let $f$ be a morphism in a quasi-abelian category. Then the induced morphism $\overline{f} : \operatorname{cok} \ker f \to \ker \operatorname{cok} f$ is always a bimorphism, i.e., a monomorphism and an epimorphism. A quasi-abelian category is therefore always semi-abelian.

== Examples and non-examples ==
Every abelian category is quasi-abelian. Typical non-abelian examples arise in functional analysis.

- The category of Banach spaces is quasi-abelian.
- The category of Fréchet spaces is quasi-abelian.
- The category of (Hausdorff) locally convex spaces is quasi-abelian.

Contrary to the claim by Beilinson, the category of complete separated topological vector spaces with linear topology is not quasi-abelian. On the other hand, the category of (arbitrary or Hausdorff) topological vector spaces with linear topology is quasi-abelian.

== History ==
The concept of quasi-abelian category was developed in the 1960s. The history is involved. This is in particular due to Raikov's conjecture, which stated that the notion of a semi-abelian category is equivalent to that of a quasi-abelian category. Around 2005 it turned out that the conjecture is false.

== Left and right quasi-abelian categories ==
By dividing the two conditions in the definition, one can define left quasi-abelian categories by requiring that cokernels are stable under pullbacks and right quasi-abelian categories by requiring that kernels stable under pushouts.
