= Category of abelian groups =

Category whose objects are abelian groups and whose morphisms are group homomorphisms

In mathematics, the category $\mathbf{Ab}$ has the abelian groups as objects and group homomorphisms as morphisms. This is the prototype of an abelian category: indeed, every small abelian category can be embedded in $\mathbf{Ab}$.

== Properties ==
The zero object of $\mathbf{Ab}$ is the trivial group $\{0\}$ which consists only of its neutral element.

The monomorphisms in $\mathbf{Ab}$ are the injective group homomorphisms, the epimorphisms are the surjective group homomorphisms, and the isomorphisms are the bijective group homomorphisms.

$\mathbf{Ab}$ is a full subcategory of $\mathbf{Grp}$, the category of all groups. The main difference between $\mathbf{Ab}$ and $\mathbf{Grp}$ is that the sum of two homomorphisms $f$ and $g$ between abelian groups is again a group homomorphism:

$$(f+g)(x+y)=f(x+y)+g(x+y)=f(x)+f(y)+g(x)+g(y)$$
$$=f(x)+g(x)+f(y)+g(y)=(f+g)(x)+(f+g)(y)$$

The third equality requires the group to be abelian. This addition of morphism turns $\mathbf{Ab}$ into a preadditive category, and because the direct sum of finitely many abelian groups yields a biproduct, we indeed have an additive category.

In $\mathbf{Ab}$, the notion of kernel in the category theory sense coincides with kernel in the algebraic sense, i.e. the categorical kernel of the morphism $f:A\to B$ is the subgroup $K$ of $A$ defined by $K=\{x\in A:f(x)=0\}$, together with the inclusion homomorphism $i:K\to A$. The same is true for cokernels; the cokernel of f is the quotient group $C=B/f(A)$ together with the natural projection $p:B\to C$. (Note a further crucial difference between $\mathbf{Ab}$ and $\mathbf{Grp}$: in $\mathbf{Grp}$ it can happen that $f(A)$ is not a normal subgroup of $B$, and that therefore the quotient group $B/f(A)$ cannot be formed.) With these concrete descriptions of kernels and cokernels, it is quite easy to check that $\mathbf{Ab}$ is indeed an abelian category.

The forgetful functor from $\mathbb{Z}\text{-}\mathbf{Mod}$ to $\mathbf{Ab}$ that sends a $\mathbb{Z}$-module $(M,+,\cdot)$ to its underlying abelian group $(M,+)$ and the functor from $\mathbf{Ab}$ to $\mathbb{Z}$ that sends an abelian group $(G,+)$ to the $\mathbb{Z}$-module $(G,+,\cdot)$ obtained by setting $k \cdot g := g^{k}$ define an isomorphism of categories.

The product in $\mathbf{Ab}$ is given by the product of groups, formed by taking the Cartesian product of the underlying sets and performing the group operation componentwise. Because $\mathbf{Ab}$ has kernels, one can then show that $\mathbf{Ab}$ is a complete category. The coproduct in $\mathbf{Ab}$ is given by the direct sum; since $\mathbf{Ab}$ has cokernels, it follows that $\mathbf{Ab}$ is also cocomplete.

We have a forgetful functor $\mathbf{Ab}\to\mathbf{Set}$ which assigns to each abelian group the underlying set, and to each group homomorphism the underlying function. This functor is faithful, and therefore $\mathbf{Ab}$ is a concrete category. The forgetful functor has a left adjoint (which associates to a given set the free abelian group with that set as basis) but does not have a right adjoint.

Taking direct limits in $\mathbf{Ab}$ is an exact functor. Since the group of integers $\mathbb{Z}$ serves as a generator, the category $\mathbf{Ab}$ is therefore a Grothendieck category; indeed it is the prototypical example of a Grothendieck category.

An object in $\mathbf{Ab}$ is injective if and only if it is a divisible group; it is projective if and only if it is a free abelian group. The category has a projective generator ($\mathbb{Z}$) and an injective cogenerator ($\mathbb{Q}/\mathbb{Z}$).

Given two abelian groups $A$ and $B$, their tensor product $A\otimes B$ is defined; it is again an abelian group. With this notion of product, $\mathbf{Ab}$ is a closed symmetric monoidal category.

$\mathbf{Ab}$ is not a topos since e.g. it has a zero object.

== See also ==
- Category of modules
- Abelian sheaf — many facts about the category of abelian groups continue to hold for the category of sheaves of abelian groups
