= Semi-abelian category =

In mathematics, specifically in category theory, a semi-abelian category is a pre-abelian category in which the induced morphism $\overline{f}:\operatorname{coim}f\rightarrow\operatorname{im}f$ is a bimorphism, i.e., a monomorphism and an epimorphism, for every morphism $f$.

The history of the notion is intertwined with that of a quasi-abelian category, as, for awhile, it was not known whether the two notions are distinct (see quasi-abelian category#History).

== Properties ==
The two properties used in the definition can be characterized by several equivalent conditions.

Every semi-abelian category has a maximal exact structure.

If a semi-abelian category is not quasi-abelian, then the class of all kernel-cokernel pairs does not form an exact structure.

== Examples ==
Every quasiabelian category is semiabelian. In particular, every abelian category is semi-abelian. Non-quasiabelian examples are the following.

- The category of (possibly non-Hausdorff) bornological spaces is semiabelian.
- Let $Q$ be the quiver
$\begin{array}{ccc} 1 & \xrightarrow{} & 2 & \xleftarrow{} & 3 \\ \downarrow{} & & \downarrow{}& & \downarrow{}\\ 4 & \xrightarrow{} & 5 & \xleftarrow{} & 6\\ \end{array}$

and $K$ be a field. The category of finitely generated projective modules over the algebra $KQ$ is semiabelian.

== Left and right semi-abelian categories ==
By dividing the two conditions on the induced map in the definition, one can define left semi-abelian categories by requiring that $\overline{f}$ is a monomorphism for each morphism $f$. Accordingly, right semi-abelian categories are pre-abelian categories such that $\overline{f}$ is an epimorphism for each morphism $f$.

If a category is left semi-abelian and right quasi-abelian, then it is already quasi-abelian. The same holds, if the category is right semi-abelian and left quasi-abelian.
