= Coimage =

Concept in category theory (in mathematics)

In algebra, the coimage of a homomorphism

$$f : A \rightarrow B$$

is the quotient

$$\text{coim} f = A/\ker(f)$$

of the domain by the kernel. The coimage is canonically isomorphic to the image by the first isomorphism theorem, when that theorem applies.

More generally, in category theory, the coimage of a morphism is the dual notion of the image of a morphism. If $f : X \rightarrow Y$, then a coimage of $f$ (if it exists) is an epimorphism $c : X \rightarrow C$ such that

1. there is a map $f_c : C \rightarrow Y$ with $f =f_c \circ c$,
2. for any epimorphism $z : X \rightarrow Z$ for which there is a map $f_z : Z \rightarrow Y$ with $f =f_z \circ z$, there is a unique map $h : Z \rightarrow C$ such that both $c =h \circ z$ and $f_z =f_c \circ h$

== See also ==
- Quotient object
- Cokernel
