= Image (category theory) =

In category theory, a branch of mathematics, the image of a morphism is a generalization of the image of a function.

== General definition ==
Given a category $C$ and a morphism $f\colon X\to Y$ in $C$, the image of $f$ is a monomorphism $m\colon I\to Y$ satisfying the following universal property:

1. There exists a morphism $e\colon X\to I$ such that $f = m\, e$.
2. For any object $I'$ with a morphism $e'\colon X\to I'$ and a monomorphism $m'\colon I'\to Y$ such that $f = m'\, e'$, there exists a unique morphism $v\colon I\to I'$ such that $m = m'\, v$.

Remarks:

1. such a factorization does not necessarily exist.
2. $e$ is unique by definition of $m$ monic.
3. $m'e'=f=me=m've$, therefore $e'=ve$ by $m'$ monic.
4. $v$ is monic.
5. $m = m'\, v$ already implies that $v$ is unique.

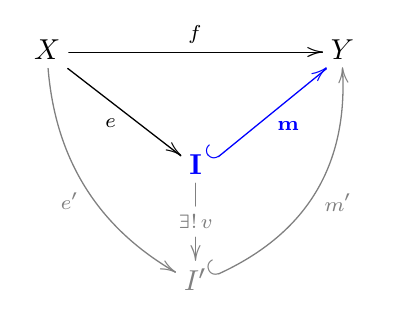

The image of $f$ is often denoted by $\text{Im} f$ or $\text{Im} (f)$.

Proposition: If $C$ has all equalizers then the $e$ in the factorization $f= m\, e$ of (1) is an epimorphism.

Proof

Let $\alpha,\, \beta$ be such that $\alpha\, e =\beta\, e$, one needs to show that $\alpha=\beta$. Since the equalizer of $(\alpha, \beta)$ exists, $e$ factorizes as $e= q\, e'$ with $q$ monic. But then $f= (m\, q)\, e'$ is a factorization of $f$ with $(m\, q)$ monomorphism. Hence by the universal property of the image there exists a unique arrow $v: I \to Eq_{\alpha,\beta}$ such that $m = m\,q\, v$ and since $m$ is monic $\text{id}_I = q\, v$. Furthermore, one has $m\, q = (m q v)\,q$ and by the monomorphism property of $mq$ one obtains $\text{id}_{Eq_{\alpha,\beta}}= v\, q$.

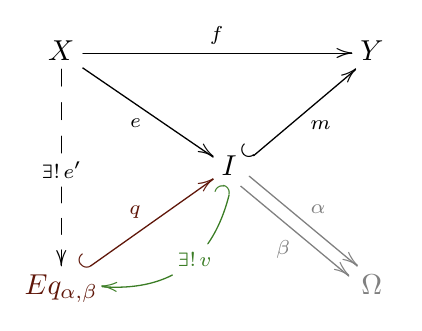

This means that $I \equiv Eq_{\alpha,\beta}$ and thus that $\text{id}_I = q\, v$ equalizes $(\alpha, \beta)$, whence $\alpha = \beta$.

== Second definition ==
In a category $C$ with all finite limits and colimits, the image is defined as the equalizer $(Im,m)$ of the so-called cokernel pair $(Y \sqcup_X Y, i_1, i_2)$, which is the cocartesian of a morphism with itself over its domain, which will result in a pair of morphisms $i_1,i_2:Y\to Y\sqcup_X Y$, on which the equalizer is taken, i.e. the first of the following diagrams is cocartesian, and the second equalizing.

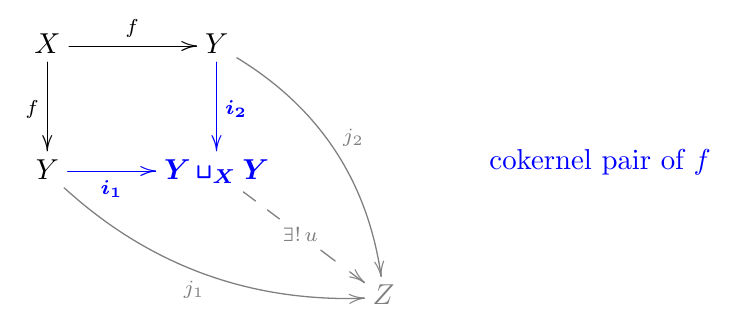

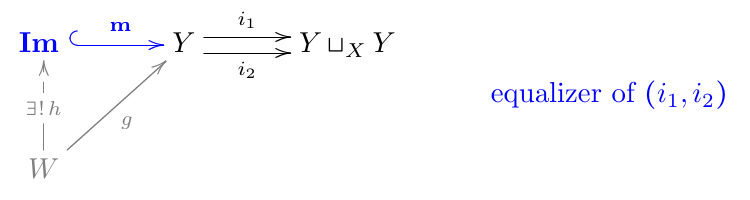

Remarks:

1. Finite bicompleteness of the category ensures that pushouts and equalizers exist.
2. $(Im,m)$ can be called regular image as $m$ is a regular monomorphism, i.e. the equalizer of a pair of morphisms. (Recall also that an equalizer is automatically a monomorphism).
3. In an abelian category, the cokernel pair property can be written $i_1\, f = i_2\, f\ \Leftrightarrow\ (i_1 - i_2)\, f = 0 = 0\, f$ and the equalizer condition $i_1\, m = i_2\, m\ \Leftrightarrow\ (i_1 - i_2)\, m = 0 \, m$. Moreover, all monomorphisms are regular.

Theorem—If $f$ always factorizes through regular monomorphisms, then the two definitions coincide.

Proof

First definition implies the second: Assume that (1) holds with $m$ regular monomorphism.

- Equalization: one needs to show that $i_1\, m= i_2\, m$ . As the cokernel pair of $f,\ i_1\, f= i_2\, f$ and by previous proposition, since $C$ has all equalizers, the arrow $e$ in the factorization $f= m\, e$ is an epimorphism, hence $i_1\, f= i_2\, f\ \Rightarrow \ i_1\, m= i_2\, m$.
- Universality: in a category with all colimits (or at least all pushouts) $m$ itself admits a cokernel pair $(Y \sqcup_{I}Y, c_1, c_2)$

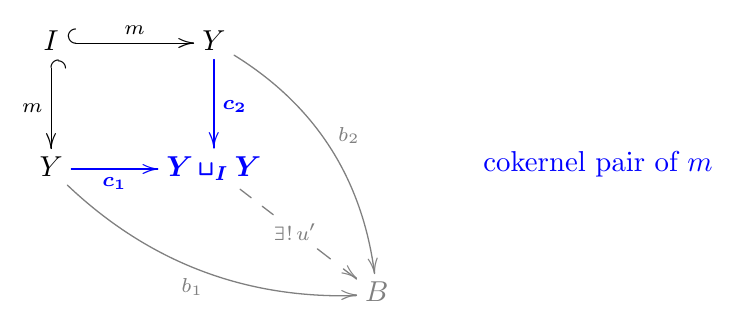

Moreover, as a regular monomorphism, $(I,m)$ is the equalizer of a pair of morphisms $b_1, b_2: Y \longrightarrow B$ but we claim here that it is also the equalizer of $c_1, c_2: Y \longrightarrow Y \sqcup_{I}Y$.
Indeed, by construction $b_1\, m = b_2\, m$ thus the "cokernel pair" diagram for $m$ yields a unique morphism $u': Y \sqcup_{I}Y \longrightarrow B$ such that $b_1 = u'\, c_1,\ b_2 = u'\, c_2$. Now, a map $m': I'\longrightarrow Y$ which equalizes $(c_1, c_2)$ also satisfies $b_1\, m'= u'\, c_1 \, m'= u'\, c_2\, m'= b_2\, m'$, hence by the equalizer diagram for $(b_1, b_2)$, there exists a unique map $h': I'\to I$ such that $m'= m\, h'$.
Finally, use the cokernel pair diagram (of $f$) with $j_1 := c_1,\ j_2 := c_2,\ Z:= Y\sqcup_I Y$ : there exists a unique $u: Y \sqcup_{X}Y \longrightarrow Y\sqcup_I Y$ such that $c_1 = u\, i_1,\ c_2 = u\, i_2$. Therefore, any map $g$ which equalizes $(i_1, i_2)$ also equalizes $(c_1, c_2)$ and thus uniquely factorizes as $g= m\, h'$. This exactly means that $(I,m)$ is the equalizer of $(i_1, i_2)$.

Second definition implies the first:

- Factorization: taking $m' := f$ in the equalizer diagram ($m'$ corresponds to $g$), one obtains the factorization $f = m\, h$.
- Universality: let $f = m'\, e'$ be a factorization with $m'$ regular monomorphism, i.e. the equalizer of some pair $(d_1, d_2)$.

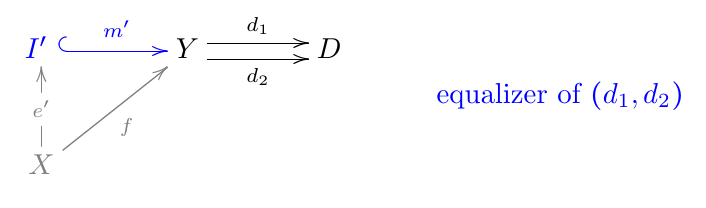

Then $d_1\, m'= d_2\, m'\ \Rightarrow \ d_1\, f=d_1\, m'\, e= d_2\, m'\, e= d_2\, f$ so that by the "cokernel pair" diagram (of $f$), with $j_1 := d_1,\ j_2 := d_2,\ Z:= D$, there exists a unique $u'': Y \sqcup_{X}Y \longrightarrow D$ such that $d_1 = u''\, i_1,\ d_2 = u''\, i_2$.
Now, from $i_1\, m= i_2\, m$ (m from the equalizer of (i_{1}, i_{2}) diagram), one obtains $d_1\, m= u''\, i_1\, m = u''\, i_2\, m = d_2\, m$, hence by the universality in the (equalizer of (d_{1}, d_{2}) diagram, with f replaced by m), there exists a unique $v: Im \longrightarrow I'$ such that $m = m'\, v$.

== Examples ==
In the category of sets the image of a morphism $f\colon X \to Y$ is the inclusion from the ordinary image $\{f(x) ~|~ x \in X\}$ to $Y$. In many concrete categories such as groups, abelian groups and (left- or right) modules, the image of a morphism is the image of the correspondent morphism in the category of sets.

In any normal category with a zero object and kernels and cokernels for every morphism, the image of a morphism $f$ can be expressed as follows:

im f = ker coker f

In an abelian category (which is in particular binormal), if f is a monomorphism then f = ker coker f, and so f = im f.

== Essential Image ==
A related notion to image is essential image.

A subcategory $C \subset B$ of a (strict) category is said to be replete if for every $x \in C$, and for every isomorphism $\iota: x \to y$, both $\iota$ and $y$ belong to C.

Let $F \colon A \to B$ be a functor between categories. The essential image of $F$ is the smallest replete subcategory of the target category $B$ containing the image of $A$ under $F$.

== See also ==
- Subobject
- Coimage
- Image (mathematics)
