= Fundamental theorem on homomorphisms =

Theorem relating a group with the image and kernel of a homomorphism

In abstract algebra, the fundamental theorem on homomorphisms, also known as the fundamental homomorphism theorem, the first isomorphism theorem, or just the homomorphism theorem, relates the structure of two objects between which a homomorphism is given, and of the kernel and image of the homomorphism.

The homomorphism theorem is used to prove the isomorphism theorems. Similar theorems are valid for vector spaces, modules, and rings.

It dates back to the work of Richard Dedekind, and was further formalized by Emmy Noether into the isomorphism theorems.

== Group-theoretic version ==
Diagram of the fundamental theorem on homomorphisms, where $f$ is a homomorphism, $N$ is a normal subgroup of $G$ and $e$ is the identity element of $G$.

Given two groups $G$ and $H$ and a group homomorphism $f: G \rarr H$, let $N$ be a normal subgroup in $G$ and $\varphi$ the natural surjective homomorphism $G \rarr G / N$ (where $G / N$ is the quotient group of $G$ by $N$). If $N$ is a subset of $\ker(f)$ (where $\ker$ represents a kernel) then there exists a unique homomorphism $h: G / N \rarr H$ such that $f = h \circ \varphi$.

In other words, the natural projection $\varphi$ is universal among homomorphisms on $G$ that map $N$ to the identity element.

The situation is described by the following commutative diagram:

$h$ is injective if and only if $N = \ker(f)$. Therefore, by setting $N = \ker(f)$, we immediately get the first isomorphism theorem.

We can write the statement of the fundamental theorem on homomorphisms of groups as "every homomorphic image of a group is isomorphic to a quotient group".

== Proof ==
The proof follows from two basic facts about homomorphisms, namely their preservation of the group operation, and their mapping of the identity element to the identity element. We need to show that if $f: G \to H$ is a homomorphism of groups, then:

1. $\text{im}(f)$ is a subgroup of $H$.
2. $G / \ker(f)$ is isomorphic to $\text{im}(f)$.

=== Proof of 1 ===
The operation that is preserved by $f$ is the group operation. If $a, b \in \text{im}(f)$, then there exist elements $a', b' \in G$ such that $f(a')=a$ and $f(b')=b$. For these $a$ and $b$, we have $ab = f(a')f(b') = f(a'b') \in \text{im}(f)$ (since $f$ preserves the group operation), and thus, the closure property is satisfied in $\text{im}(f)$. The identity element $e \in H$ is also in $\text{im}(f)$ because $f$ maps the identity element of $G$ to it. Since every element $a'$ in $G$ has an inverse $(a')^{-1}$ such that $f((a')^{-1}) = (f(a'))^{-1}$ (because $f$ preserves the inverse property as well), we have an inverse for each element $f(a') = a$ in $\text{im}(f)$, therefore, $\text{im}(f)$ is a subgroup of $H$.

=== Proof of 2 ===
Construct a map $\psi: G / \ker(f) \to \text{im}(f)$ by $\psi(a\ker(f)) = f(a)$. This map is well-defined, as if $a\ker(f) = b\ker(f)$, then $b^{-1}a \in \ker(f)$ and so $f(b^{-1}a) = e \Rightarrow f(b^{-1})f(a) = e$ which gives $f(a) = f(b)$. This map is an isomorphism. $\psi$ is surjective onto $\text{im}(f)$ by definition. To show injectivity, if $\psi(a\ker(f)) = \psi(b\ker(f))$, then $f(a) = f(b)$, which implies $b^{-1}a \in\ker(f)$ so $a\ker(f) = b\ker(f)$.

Finally,

$$\psi((a\ker(f))(b\ker(f))) = \psi(ab\ker(f)) = f(ab)$$
$$= f(a)f(b) = \psi(a\ker(f))\psi(b\ker(f)),$$

hence $\psi$ preserves the group operation. Hence $\psi$ is an isomorphism between $G / \ker(f)$ and $\text{im}(f)$, which completes the proof.

== Applications ==
The group theoretic version of the fundamental homomorphism theorem can be used to show that two selected groups are isomorphic. Two examples are shown below.

=== Integers modulo n ===
For each $n \in \mathbb{N}$, consider the groups $\mathbb{Z}$ and $\mathbb{Z}_n$ and a group homomorphism $f:\mathbb{Z} \rightarrow \mathbb{Z}_n$ defined by $m \mapsto m \text{ mod }n$ (see modular arithmetic). Next, consider the kernel of $f$, $\text{ker} (f) = n \mathbb{Z}$, which is a normal subgroup in $\mathbb{Z}$. There exists a natural surjective homomorphism $\varphi : \mathbb{Z} \rightarrow \mathbb{Z}/n\mathbb{Z}$ defined by $m \mapsto m+n\mathbb{Z}$. The theorem asserts that there exists an isomorphism $h$ between $\mathbb{Z}_n$ and $\mathbb{Z}/n\mathbb{Z}$, or in other words $\mathbb{Z}_n \cong \mathbb{Z}/n \mathbb{Z}$. The commutative diagram is illustrated below.

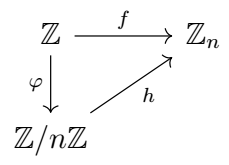

=== N / C theorem ===
Let $G$ be a group with subgroup $H$. Let $C_G(H)$, $N_G(H)$ and $\operatorname{Aut}(H)$ be the centralizer, the normalizer and the automorphism group of $H$ in $G$, respectively. Then, the $N/C$ theorem states that $N_G(H)/C_G(H)$ is isomorphic to a subgroup of $\operatorname{Aut}(H)$.

==== Proof ====
We are able to find a group homomorphism $f: N_G(H) \rightarrow \operatorname{Aut}(H)$ defined by $g \mapsto ghg^{-1}$, for all $h \in H$. Clearly, the kernel of $f$ is $C_G(H)$. Hence, we have a natural surjective homomorphism $\varphi : N_G(H) \rightarrow N_G(H)/C_G(H)$ defined by $g \mapsto gC(H)$. The fundamental homomorphism theorem then asserts that there exists an isomorphism between $N_G(H)/C_G(H)$ and $\varphi(N_G(H))$, which is a subgroup of $\operatorname{Aut}(H)$.

== See also ==
- List of theorems called fundamental
- Quotient category
