= Quasimorphism =

Group homomorphism up to bounded error

In group theory, given a group $G$, a quasimorphism (or quasi-morphism) is a function $f:G\to\mathbb{R}$ which is additive up to bounded error, i.e. there exists a constant $D\geq 0$ such that $|f(gh)-f(g)-f(h)|\leq D$ for all $g, h\in G$. The least positive value of $D$ for which this inequality is satisfied is called the defect of $f$, written as $D(f)$. For a group $G$, quasimorphisms form a subspace of the function space $\mathbb{R}^G$.

== Examples ==
- Group homomorphisms and bounded functions from $G$ to $\mathbb{R}$ are quasimorphisms. The sum of a group homomorphism and a bounded function is also a quasimorphism, and functions of this form are sometimes referred to as "trivial" quasimorphisms.
- Let $G=F_S$ be a free group over a set $S$. For a reduced word $w$ in $S$, we first define the big counting function $C_w:F_S\to \mathbb{Z}_{\geq 0}$, which returns for $g\in G$ the number of copies of $w$ in the reduced representative of $g$. Similarly, we define the little counting function $c_w:F_S\to\mathbb{Z}_{\geq 0}$, returning the maximum number of non-overlapping copies in the reduced representative of $g$. For example, $C_{aa}(aaaa)=3$ and $c_{aa}(aaaa)=2$. Then, a big counting quasimorphism (resp. little counting quasimorphism) is a function of the form $H_w(g)=C_w(g)-C_{w^{-1}}(g)$ (resp. $h_w(g)=c_w(g)-c_{w^{-1}}(g))$.
- The rotation number $\widetilde{\text{rot}}:\widetilde{\text{Homeo}^+(S^1)}\to\mathbb{R}$ is a quasimorphism, where $\text{Homeo}^+(S^1)$ denotes the orientation-preserving homeomorphisms of the circle, and $\widetilde{\text{Homeo}^+(S^1)}$ denotes its universal covering.

== Homogeneous ==
A quasimorphism is homogeneous if $f(g^n)=nf(g)$ for all $g\in G, n\in \mathbb{Z}$. It turns out the study of quasimorphisms can be reduced to the study of homogeneous quasimorphisms, as every quasimorphism $f:G\to\mathbb{R}$ is a bounded distance away from a unique homogeneous quasimorphism $\overline{f}:G\to\mathbb{R}$, given by :

$$\overline{f}(g)=\lim_{n\to\infty}\frac{f(g^n)}{n}$$.

A homogeneous quasimorphism $f:G\to\mathbb{R}$ has the following properties:

- It is constant on conjugacy classes, i.e. $f(g^{-1}hg)=f(h)$ for all $g, h\in G$,
- If $G$ is abelian, then $f$ is a group homomorphism. The above remark implies that in this case all quasimorphisms are "trivial".

== Integer-valued ==
One can also define quasimorphisms similarly in the case of a function $f:G\to\mathbb{Z}$. In this case, the above discussion about homogeneous quasimorphisms does not hold anymore, as the limit $\lim_{n\to\infty}f(g^n)/n$ does not exist in $\mathbb{Z}$ in general.

For example, for $\alpha\in\mathbb{R}$, the map $\mathbb{Z}\to\mathbb{Z}:n\mapsto\lfloor\alpha n\rfloor$ is a quasimorphism. There is a construction of the real numbers as a quotient of quasimorphisms $\mathbb{Z}\to\mathbb{Z}$ by an appropriate equivalence relation, see Construction of the reals numbers from integers (Eudoxus reals).
