= Ring homomorphism =

Structure-preserving function between two rings

In mathematics, a ring homomorphism is a structure-preserving function between two rings. More explicitly, if R and S are rings, then a ring homomorphism is a function f : R → S that preserves addition, multiplication and multiplicative identity; that is,
$$\begin{align}
f(a+b)&= f(a) + f(b),\\
f(ab) &= f(a)f(b), \\
f(1) &= 1,
\end{align}$$
for all a, b in R. (Note: As usual, the same symbols are used in different rings for addition, subtraction, multiplication, 0 and 1. In general, no ambiguity may arise. For example, in $f(1)=1$, the first $1$ must belong to the domain of $f$, and is therefore the multiplicative identity of $R$. Similarly, the second $1$ can only be the multiplicative identity of $S$.)

These conditions imply that additive inverses and the additive identity are also preserved (see Group homomorphism).

If, in addition, f is a bijection, then its inverse f^{−1} is also a ring homomorphism. In this case, f is called a ring isomorphism, and the rings R and S are said to be isomorphic. From the standpoint of ring theory, isomorphic rings have exactly the same properties.

If R and S are rngs, then the corresponding notion is that of a rng homomorphism, (Note: Some authors use the term "ring" to refer to structures that do not require a multiplicative identity; instead of "rng", "ring", and "rng homomorphism", they use the terms "ring", "ring with identity", and "ring homomorphism", respectively. Because of this, some other authors, to avoid ambiguity, explicitly specify that rings are unital and that homomorphisms preserve the identity.) defined as above except without the third condition f(1_{R}) = 1_{S}. A rng homomorphism between (unital) rings need not be a ring homomorphism.

The composition of two ring homomorphisms is a ring homomorphism. It follows that the rings form a category with ring homomorphisms as morphisms (see Category of rings). In particular, one obtains the notions of ring endomorphism, ring isomorphism, and ring automorphism.

== Properties ==
Let f : R → S be a ring homomorphism. Then, directly from these definitions, one can deduce:

- f(0_{R}) = 0_{S}.
- f(−a) = −f(a) for all a in R.
- For any unit a in R, f(a) is a unit element such that f(a)^{−1} = f(a^{−1}). In particular, f induces a group homomorphism from the (multiplicative) group of units of R to the (multiplicative) group of units of S (or of im(f)).
- The image of f, denoted im(f), is a subring of S.
- The kernel of f, defined as ker(f) = {a in R | f(a) = 0_{S}}, is a two-sided ideal in R. Every two-sided ideal in a ring R is the kernel of some ring homomorphism.
- A homomorphism is injective if and only if its kernel is the zero ideal.
- The characteristic of S divides the characteristic of R. This can sometimes be used to show that between certain rings R and S, no ring homomorphism R → S exists.
- If R_{p} is the smallest subring contained in R and S_{p} is the smallest subring contained in S, then every ring homomorphism f : R → S induces a ring homomorphism f_{p} : R_{p} → S_{p}.
- If R is a division ring and S is not the zero ring, then f is injective.
- If both R and S are fields, then im(f) is a subfield of S, so S can be viewed as a field extension of R.
- If I is an ideal of S then f^{−1}(I) is an ideal of R.
- If R and S are commutative and P is a prime ideal of S then f^{−1}(P) is a prime ideal of R.
- If R and S are commutative, M is a maximal ideal of S, and f is surjective, then f^{−1}(M) is a maximal ideal of R.
- If R and S are commutative and S is an integral domain, then ker(f) is a prime ideal of R.
- If R and S are commutative, S is a field, and f is surjective, then ker(f) is a maximal ideal of R.
- If f is surjective, P is prime (maximal) ideal in R and ker(f) ⊆ P, then f(P) is prime (maximal) ideal in S.

Moreover,

- The composition of ring homomorphisms S → T and R → S is a ring homomorphism R → T.
- For each ring R, the identity map R → R is a ring homomorphism.
- Therefore, the class of all rings together with ring homomorphisms forms a category, the category of rings.
- The zero map R → S that sends every element of R to 0 is a ring homomorphism only if S is the zero ring (the ring whose only element is zero).
- For every ring R, there is a unique ring homomorphism Z → R. This says that the ring of integers is an initial object in the category of rings.
- For every ring R, there is a unique ring homomorphism from R to the zero ring. This says that the zero ring is a terminal object in the category of rings.
- As the initial object is not isomorphic to the terminal object, there is no zero object in the category of rings; in particular, the zero ring is not a zero object in the category of rings.

== Examples ==
- The function f : Z → Z/nZ, defined by f(a) = [a]_{n} = a mod n is a surjective ring homomorphism with kernel nZ (see Modular arithmetic).
- The complex conjugation C → C is a ring homomorphism (this is an example of a ring automorphism).
- For a ring R of prime characteristic p, R → R, x → x^{p} is a ring endomorphism called the Frobenius endomorphism.
- If R and S are rings, the zero function from R to S is a ring homomorphism if and only if S is the zero ring (otherwise it fails to map 1_{R} to 1_{S}). On the other hand, the zero function is always a rng homomorphism.
- If R[X] denotes the ring of all polynomials in the variable X with coefficients in the real numbers R, and C denotes the complex numbers, then the function f : R[X] → C defined by f(p) = p(i) (substitute the imaginary unit i for the variable X in the polynomial p) is a surjective ring homomorphism. The kernel of f consists of all polynomials in R[X] that are divisible by X^{2} + 1.
- If f : R → S is a ring homomorphism between the rings R and S, then f induces a ring homomorphism between the matrix rings M_{n}(R) → M_{n}(S).
- Let V be a vector space over a field k. Then the map ρ : k → End(V) given by ρ(a)v = av is a ring homomorphism. More generally, given an abelian group M, a module structure on M over a ring R is equivalent to giving a ring homomorphism R → End(M).
- A unital algebra homomorphism between unital associative algebras over a commutative ring R is a ring homomorphism that is also R-linear.

== Non-examples ==
- The function f : Z/6Z → Z/6Z defined by f([a]_{6}) = [4a]_{6} is not a ring homomorphism, but is a rng homomorphism (and rng endomorphism), with kernel 3Z/6Z and image 2Z/6Z (which is isomorphic to Z/3Z).
- There is no ring homomorphism Z/nZ → Z for any n ≥ 1.
- If R and S are rings, the inclusion R → R × S that sends each r to (r,0) is a rng homomorphism, but not a ring homomorphism (if S is not the zero ring), since it does not map the multiplicative identity 1 of R to the multiplicative identity (1,1) of R × S.

== Category of rings ==
=== Endomorphisms, isomorphisms, and automorphisms ===
- A ring endomorphism is a ring homomorphism from a ring to itself.
- A ring isomorphism is a ring homomorphism having a 2-sided inverse that is also a ring homomorphism. One can prove that a ring homomorphism is an isomorphism if and only if it is bijective as a function on the underlying sets. If there exists a ring isomorphism between two rings R and S, then R and S are called isomorphic. Isomorphic rings differ only by a relabeling of elements. Example: Up to isomorphism, there are four rings of order 4. (This means that there are four pairwise non-isomorphic rings of order 4 such that every other ring of order 4 is isomorphic to one of them.) On the other hand, up to isomorphism, there are eleven rngs of order 4.
- A ring automorphism is a ring isomorphism from a ring to itself.

=== Monomorphisms and epimorphisms ===
Injective ring homomorphisms are identical to monomorphisms in the category of rings: If f : R → S is a monomorphism that is not injective, then it sends some r_{1} and r_{2} to the same element of S. Consider the two maps g_{1} and g_{2} from Z[x] to R that map x to r_{1} and r_{2}, respectively; f ∘ g_{1} and f ∘ g_{2} are identical, but since f is a monomorphism this is impossible.

However, surjective ring homomorphisms are vastly different from epimorphisms in the category of rings. For example, the inclusion Z ⊆ Q with the identity mapping is a ring epimorphism, but not a surjection. However, every ring epimorphism is also a strong epimorphism, the converse being true in every category.

== See also ==
- Change of rings
