= Zero morphism =

Bi-universal property in category theory

In category theory, a branch of mathematics, a zero morphism is a special kind of morphism exhibiting properties like the morphisms to and from a zero object.

== Definitions ==
Suppose C is a category, and f : X → Y is a morphism in C. The morphism f is called a constant morphism (or sometimes left zero morphism) if for any object W in C and any g, h : W → X, fg = fh. Dually, f is called a coconstant morphism (or sometimes right zero morphism) if for any object Z in C and any g, h : Y → Z, gf = hf. A zero morphism is one that is both a constant morphism and a coconstant morphism.

A category with zero morphisms is one where, for every two objects A and B in C, there is a fixed morphism 0_{AB} : A → B, and this collection of morphisms is such that for all objects X, Y, Z in C and all morphisms f : Y → Z, g : X → Y, the following diagram commutes:

The morphisms 0_{XY} necessarily are zero morphisms and form a compatible system of zero morphisms.

If C is a category with zero morphisms, then the collection of 0_{XY} is unique.

This way of defining a "zero morphism" and the phrase "a category with zero morphisms" separately is unfortunate, but if each hom-set has a unique "zero morphism", then the category "has zero morphisms".

== Examples ==
- In the category of groups (or of modules), a zero morphism is a homomorphism f : G → H that maps all of G to the identity element of H. The zero object in the category of groups is the trivial group 1 = {1}, which is unique up to isomorphism. Every zero morphism can be factored through 1, i. e., f : G → 1 → H.
- More generally, suppose C is any category with a zero object 0. Then for all objects X and Y there is a unique sequence of morphisms
  0_{XY} : X → 0 → Y
  The family of all morphisms so constructed endows C with the structure of a category with zero morphisms.
- If C is a preadditive category, then every hom-set Hom(X,Y) is an abelian group and therefore has a zero element. These zero elements form a compatible family of zero morphisms for C making it into a category with zero morphisms.
- The category of sets does not have a zero object, but it does have an initial object, the empty set ∅. The only right zero morphisms in Set are the functions ∅ → X for a set X.

== Related concepts ==
If a category has zero morphisms, then one can define the notions of kernel and cokernel for any morphism in that category.
