= Kernel (algebra) =

Elements taken to zero by a homomorphism

A group homomorphism h from the group G to the group H is illustrated, with the groups represented by a blue oval on the left and a yellow circle on the right, respectively. The kernel of h is the red circle on the left, as h sends it to the identity element 1 of H.

An example for a kernel - the linear operator $L : (x,y) \longrightarrow (x, x)$ transforms all points on the $(x=0, y)$ line to the zero point $(0,0)$, thus they form the kernel for the linear operator

In algebra, the kernel of a homomorphism is the relation describing how elements in the domain of the homomorphism become related in the image. A homomorphism is a function that preserves the underlying algebraic structure in the domain to its image.

When the algebraic structures involved have an underlying group structure, the kernel is taken to be the preimage of the group's identity element in the image, that is, it consists of the elements of the domain mapping to the image's identity. For example, the map that sends every integer to its parity (that is, 0 if the number is even, 1 if the number is odd) would be a homomorphism to the integers modulo 2, and its respective kernel would be the even integers which all have 0 as its parity. The kernel of a homomorphism of group-like structures will be a singleton set that only contains the identity if and only if the homomorphism is injective, that is if the inverse image of every element consists of a single element. This means that the kernel can be viewed as a measure of the degree to which the homomorphism fails to be injective.

For some types of structure, such as abelian groups and vector spaces, the possible kernels are exactly the substructures of the same type. This is not always the case, and some kernels have received a special name, such as normal subgroups for groups and two-sided ideals for rings. The concept of a kernel has been extended to structures such that the inverse image of a single element is not sufficient for deciding whether a homomorphism is injective. In these cases, the kernel is a congruence relation.

Kernels allow defining quotient objects (also called quotient algebras in universal algebra). For many types of algebraic structure, the fundamental theorem on homomorphisms (or first isomorphism theorem) states that image of a homomorphism is isomorphic to the quotient by the kernel.

== Definition ==
=== Group homomorphisms ===
A group is a set $G$ with a binary operation $\cdot$ satisfying the following three properties for all $a,b,c \in G$:

1. Associative: $(a \cdot b) \cdot c = a \cdot (b \cdot c)$
2. Identity: There is an $e \in G$ such that $e \cdot a = a \cdot e = a$
3. Inverses: There is an $a' \in G$ for each $a \in G$ such that $a \cdot a' = a' \cdot a = e$

A group is also called abelian if it also satisfies $a \cdot b = b \cdot a$.

Let $G$ and $H$ be groups. A group homomorphism from $G$ to $H$ is a function $f: G \to H$ such that $f(ab)=f(a)f(b)$ for all $a,b \in G$. (For simplicity, the operation symbol $\cdot$ is omitted.) Letting $e_H$ be the identity element of $H$, then the kernel of $f$ is the preimage of the singleton set $\{e_H\}$; that is, the subset of $G$ consisting of all those elements of $G$ that are mapped by $f$ to the element $e_H$.

The kernel is usually denoted $\ker{f}$ (or a variation). In symbols:

$$\ker f = \{g \in G : f(g) = e_{H}\} .$$

Since a group homomorphism preserves identity elements, the identity element $e_G$ of $G$ must belong to the kernel. The homomorphism $f$ is injective if and only if its kernel is only the singleton set $\{e_G\}$.

$\ker{f}$ is a subgroup of $G$ and further it is a normal subgroup. Thus, there is a corresponding quotient group $G/\ker{f}$. This is isomorphic to $f(G)$, the image of $G$ under $f$ (which is a subgroup of $H$ also), by the first isomorphism theorem for groups.

=== Ring homomorphisms ===
A ring with identity (or unity) is a set $R$ with two binary operations $+$ and $\cdot$ satisfying:

1. $R$ with $+$ is an abelian group with identity $0$.
2. Multiplication $\cdot$ is associative.
3. Distributive: $a \cdot (b + c) = a \cdot b + a \cdot c$ and $(a + b) \cdot c = a \cdot c + b \cdot c$ for all $a,b,c \in R$
4. Multiplication $\cdot$ has an identity element $1$. (Note: Some sources do not include the multiplicative identity $1$ in the definition of a ring.)

A ring is commutative if the multiplication is commutative, and such a ring is a field when every $0 \neq a \in R$ has a multiplicative inverse, that is, some $b \in R$ where $ab=1$. Let $R$ and $S$ be rings. A ring homomorphism from $R$ to $S$ is a function $f: R \to S$ satisfying for all $a,b \in R$:

1. $f(a+b)=f(a)+f(b)$
2. $f(ab)=f(a)f(b)$

The kernel of $f$ is the kernel as additive groups. It is the preimage of the zero ideal $\{0_S\}$, that is, the subset of $R$ consisting of all those elements of $R$ that are mapped by $f$ to the element $0_S$. The kernel is usually denoted $\ker{f}$ (or a variation). In symbols:

$$\operatorname{ker} f = \{r \in R : f(r) = 0_{S}\} .$$

Since a ring homomorphism preserves zero elements, the zero element $0_R$ of $R$ must belong to the kernel. The homomorphism $f$ is injective if and only if its kernel is only the singleton set $\{0_R\}$. This is always the case if $R$ is a field, and $S$ is not the zero ring.

Since $\ker{f}$ contains the multiplicative identity only when $S$ is the zero ring, it turns out that the kernel is generally not a subring of $R$. The kernel is a subrng, and, more precisely, a two-sided ideal of $R$. Thus, it makes sense to speak of the quotient ring $R/\ker{f}$. The first isomorphism theorem for rings states that this quotient ring is naturally isomorphic to the image of $f$ (which is a subring of $S$).

=== Linear maps ===
Kernel and image of a linear map L from V to W

Given a field $F$, a vector space (over $F$) is an abelian group $V$ (with binary operation $+$ and identity $0$) with scalar multiplication from $F$ satisfying for all $a,b \in F$ and $\alpha, \beta \in V$:

1. $a(b \alpha) = (ab) \alpha$
2. $(a+b)\alpha = a\alpha + b\alpha$
3. $a(\alpha + \beta) = a\alpha + a\beta$
4. $1\alpha = \alpha$

Let $V$ and $W$ be vector spaces over the field $F$. A linear map (or linear transformation) from $V$ to $W$ is a function $T: V \to W$ satisfying for all $\alpha, \beta \in V$ and $a \in F$:

1. $T(\alpha + \beta) = T(\alpha)+T(\beta)$
2. $T(a \alpha) = a T(\alpha)$

If $0_W$ is the zero vector of $W$, then the kernel of $T$ (or null space) is the preimage of the zero subspace $\{0_W\}$; that is, the subset of $V$ consisting of all those elements of $V$ that are mapped by $T$ to the element $0_W$. The kernel is denoted as $\ker{T}$, or some variation thereof, and is symbolically defined as:

$$\ker T = \{\mathbf{v} \in V : T(\mathbf{v}) = \mathbf{0}_{W}\} .$$

Since a linear map preserves zero vectors, the zero vector $0_V$ of $V$ must belong to the kernel. The transformation $T$ is injective if and only if its kernel is reduced to the zero subspace.

The kernel $\ker{T}$ is always a linear subspace of $V$. Thus, it makes sense to speak of the quotient space $V/\ker{T}$. The first isomorphism theorem for vector spaces states that this quotient space is naturally isomorphic to the image of $T$ (which is a subspace of $W$). As a consequence, the dimension of $V$ equals the dimension of the kernel plus the dimension of the image.

=== Module homomorphisms ===
Let $R$ be a ring. A module over $R$ is defined exactly like a vector space over a field, using the same axioms, except the field is replaced with a ring. In fact, a module over a field is exactly the same as a vector space over a field. Let $M$ and $N$ be $R$-modules. A module homomorphism from $M$ to $N$ is also a function $\varphi: M \to N$ satisfying the same analogous properties of a linear map. The kernel of $\varphi$ is defined to be:

$$\ker \varphi = \{m \in M \ | \ \varphi (m) = 0\}$$

Every kernel is a submodule of the domain module, which means they always contain 0, the additive identity of the module. Kernels of abelian groups can be considered a particular kind of module kernel when the underlying ring is the integers.

== Examples ==
=== Group homomorphisms ===
Let $G$ be the cyclic group on 6 elements $\{0,1,2,3,4,5\}$ with modular addition, $H$ be the cyclic on 2 elements $\{0,1\}$ with modular addition, and $f$ the homomorphism that maps each element $g \in G$ to the element $g$ modulo 2 in $H$. Then $\ker f = \{0,2,4\}$, since all these elements are mapped to $0 \in H$. The quotient group $G / \ker{f}$ has two elements: $\{0,2,4\}$ and $\{1,3,5\}$, and is isomorphic to $H$.

Given a isomorphism $\varphi: G \to H$, one has $\ker \varphi = 1$. On the other hand, if this mapping is merely a homomorphism where H is the trivial group, then $\varphi(g)=1$ for all $g \in G$, so thus $\ker \varphi = G$.

Let $\varphi: \mathbb{R}^2 \to \mathbb{R}$ be the map defined as $\varphi((x,y)) = x$. Then this is a homomorphism with the kernel consisting precisely the points of the form $(0,y)$. This mapping is considered the "projection onto the x-axis." A similar phenomenon occurs with the mapping $f: (\mathbb{R}^\times)^2 \to \mathbb{R}^\times$ defined as $f(a,b)=b$, where the kernel is the points of the form $(a,1)$

For a non-abelian example, let $Q_8$ denote the Quaternion group, and $V_4$ the Klein 4-group. Define a mapping $\varphi: Q_8 \to V_4$ to be:

$$\varphi(\pm1)=1$$
$$\varphi(\pm i)=a$$
$$\varphi(\pm j)=b$$
$$\varphi(\pm k)=c$$

Then this mapping is a homomorphism where $\ker \varphi = \{ \pm 1 \}$.

Let $S^1$ denote the circle group, consisting of all complex numbers with absolute value (or modulus) of $1$, with the group operation being multiplication. Then the function $f: \mathbb{R} \to S^1$ sending $x \mapsto e^{2\pi ix}=\cos(2\pi x)+i\sin(2\pi x)$ is a homomorphism with the integers being the kernel. The first isomorphism theorem then implies that $\mathbb{R}/\mathbb{Z} \cong S^1$.

The symmetric group on $n$ elements, $S_n$, has a surjective homomorphism $\epsilon: S_n \to \mathbb{Z}_2$ that takes each permutation to the parity of the number of transpositions whose product is that permutation. The alternating group $A_n = \ker \epsilon$ is the kernel of this homomorphism, consisting of the even permutations. The alternating group is a non-abelian simple group for $n \geq 5$.

The determinant of $n \times n$ invertible matrices of the real numbers $\mathbb{R}$, whose set is denoted $GL(n, \mathbb{R})$ and called the general linear group of $n \times n$ matrices of $\mathbb{R}$, is a homomorphism onto the multiplication group $\mathbb{R}^\times$ (consisting of all non-zero real numbers), and the kernel of the determinant is called the special linear group $SL(n,\mathbb{R})$ of $n \times n$ matrices of $\mathbb{R}$. These are the matrices whose determinant is precisely $1$.

Given a group $G$ and an element, the mapping $x \mapsto gxg^{-1}$ is an automorphism - an isomorphism whose domain and image are the same group. This gives a homomorphism from $G$ to its automorphism group $\text{Aut}(G)$, mapping each $g$ to its respective inner automorphism as described, and the kernel of this homomorphism is the center $Z(G)$ of $G$, consisting of $g \in G$ where for every $x \in G$, we have $gxg^{-1}=x$, or equivalently $gx=xg$. More generally, for every normal subgroup $H$ of $G$ (i.e. groups closed under conjugation), this conjugation map is also an automorphism on $H$, giving another homomorphism $G$ to $\text{Aut}(H)$, with the kernel being the centralizer $C_G(H)$ of $H$ in $G$, being the set of $g \in G$ where for every $h \in H$, we have $ghg^{-1}=h$.

=== Ring homomorphisms ===
Consider the mapping $\varphi : \mathbb{Z} \to \mathbb{Z}/2\mathbb{Z}$ where the later ring is the integers modulo 2 and the map sends each number to its parity; 0 for even numbers, and 1 for odd numbers. This mapping turns out to be a homomorphism, and since the additive identity of the later ring is 0, the kernel is precisely the even numbers.

Let $\varphi: \mathbb{Q}[x] \to \mathbb{Q}$ be defined as $\varphi(p(x))=p(0)$. This mapping, which happens to be a homomorphism, sends each polynomial to its constant term. It maps a polynomial to zero if and only if said polynomial's constant term is 0. Polynomials with real coefficients can receive a similar homomorphism, with its kernel being the polynomials with constant term 0.

=== Linear maps ===
Let $\varphi: \mathbb{C}^3 \to \mathbb{C}$ be defined as $\varphi(x,y,z) = x+2y+3z$, then the kernel of $\varphi$ (that is, the null space) will be the set of points $(x,y,z) \in \mathbb{C}^3$ such that $x+2y+3z=0$, and this set is a subspace of $\mathbb{C}^3$ (the same is true for every kernel of a linear map).

If $D$ represents the derivative operator on real polynomials, then the kernel of $D$ will consist of the polynomials with deterivative equal to 0, that is the constant functions.

Consider the mapping $(Tp)(x)=x^2p(x)$, where $p$ is a polynomial with real coefficients. Then $T$ is a linear map whose kernel is precisely 0, since 0 is the only polynomial to satisfy $x^2p(x) = 0$ for all $x \in \mathbb{R}$.

== Quotient algebras ==
The kernel of a homomorphism can be used to define a quotient algebra. Let $G$ and $H$ be groups, $\varphi: G \to H$ be a group homomorphism, and denote $K = \ker \varphi$. Put $G/K$ to be the set of fibers of the homomorphism $\varphi$, where a fiber is the set of points of the domain mapping to a single point in the range. Let $X_a \in G/K$ denotes the fiber of the element $a \in H$, then a group operation on the set of fibers can be endowed by $X_a X_b = X_{ab}$, and $G/K$ is called the quotient group (or factor group), to be read as "G modulo K" or "G mod K". The terminology arises from the fact that the kernel represents the fiber of the identity element of the range, $H$, and that the remaining elements are simply "translates" of the kernel, so the quotient group is obtained by "dividing out" the kernel.

The fibers can also be described by looking at the domain relative to the kernel; given $X \in G/K$ and any element $u \in X$, then $X = uK = Ku$ where:

$$uK = \{ uk \ | \ k \in K \}$$
$$Ku = \{ ku \ | \ k \in K \}$$

these sets are called the left and right cosets respectively, and can be defined in general for any arbitrary subgroup of $G$. The group operation can then be defined as $uK \circ vK = (uk)K$, which is well-defined regardless of the choice of representatives of the fibers.

According to the first isomorphism theorem, there is an isomorphism $\mu: G/K \to \varphi(G)$, where the later group is the image of the homomorphism $\varphi$, and the isomorphism is defined as $\mu(uK)=\varphi(u)$, and such map is also well-defined.

For rings, modules, and vector spaces, one can define the respective quotient algebras via the underlying additive group structure, with cosets represented as $x+K$. Ring multiplication can be defined on the quotient algebra as $(x+K)(y+K)=xy+K$, and is well-defined. For a ring $R$ (possibly a field when describing vector spaces) and a module homomorphism $\varphi: M \to N$ with kernel $K = \ker \varphi$, one can define scalar multiplication on $G/K$ by $r(x+K)=rx+K$ for $r \in R$ and $x \in M$, which will also be well-defined.

== Kernel structures ==
The structure of kernels allows for the building of quotient algebras from structures satisfying the properties of kernels. Any subgroup $N$ of a group $G$ can construct a quotient $G/N$ by the set of all cosets of $N$ in $G$. The natural way to turn this into a group, similar to the treatment for the quotient by a kernel, is to define an operation on (left) cosets by $uN \cdot vN = (uv)N$, however this operation is well defined if and only if the subgroup $N$ is closed under conjugation under $G$, that is, if $g \in G$ and $n \in N$, then $gng^{-1} \in N$. Furthermore, the operation being well defined is sufficient for the quotient to be a group. Subgroups satisfying this property are called normal subgroups. Every kernel of a group is a normal subgroup, and for a given normal subgroup $N$ of a group $G$, the natural projection $\pi: G \to G/N$ defined as $\pi(g) = gN$ is a homomorphism with $\ker \pi = N$, so the normal subgroups are precisely the subgroups which are kernels. The closure under conjugation, however, gives a criterion for when a subgroup is a kernel for some homomorphism.

For a ring $R$, treating it as a group, one can take a quotient group via an arbitrary subgroup $I$ of the ring, which will be normal due to the ring's additive group being abelian. To define multiplication on $R/I$, the multiplication of cosets, defined as $(r+I)(s+I) = rs + I$ needs to be well-defined. Taking representatives $r+\alpha$ and $s+\beta$ of $r + I$ and $s + I$ respectively, for $r,s \in R$ and $\alpha, \beta \in I$, yields:

$$(r + \alpha)(s + \beta) + I = rs + I$$

Setting $r = s = 0$ implies that $I$ is closed under multiplication, while setting $\alpha = s = 0$ shows that $r\beta \in I$, that is, $I$ is closed under arbitrary multiplication by elements on the left. Similarly, taking $r = \beta = 0$ implies that $I$ is also closed under multiplication by arbitrary elements on the right. Any subgroup of $R$ that is closed under multiplication by any element of the ring is called an ideal. Analogously to normal subgroups, the ideals of a ring are precisely the kernels of homomorphisms.

== Exact sequence ==
An exact sequence of groups. At each pair of homomorphism, the image of the previous homomorphism becomes the kernel of the next homomorphism, that is they get sent to the identity element.

Kernels are used to define exact sequences of homomorphisms for groups and modules. Given modules $A$, $B$, and $C$, a pair of homomorphisms $\psi: A \to B, \varphi: B \to C$, written as $A \xrightarrow{\psi} B \xrightarrow{\varphi} C$ is said to be exact (at $B$) if $\text{image } \psi = \ker \varphi$. An exact sequence is then a sequence of modules and homomorphisms $\cdots \to X_{n-1} \to X_n \to X_{n+1} \to \cdots$ where each adjacent pair of modules and homomorphisms is exact.

It is unnecessary to label the homomorphisms in an exact sequence which start or end at the zero module as there is only one unique map; the map $0 \mapsto 0$ when the zero module is the domain, and the map $b \mapsto 0$ when the zero module is the range. Exact sequences can be used to describe when a homomorphism is injective, surjective, or an isomorphism. In particular, the sequences $0 \to A \xrightarrow{f} B$, $B \xrightarrow{g} C \to 0$, and $0 \to A \xrightarrow{h} B \to 0$ are exact if and only if the labeled homomorphism are injective, surjective, and an isomorphism respectively.

A particular kind of exact sequence is a short exact sequence, which is of the form $0 \to A \xrightarrow{\psi} B \xrightarrow{\varphi} C \to 0$. These sequences are related to the extension problem: given modules $A$ and $C$, determine the modules $B$ where $A$ is a submodule of $B$, and their resulting quotient is isomorphic to $C$. Such a module is called an extension of $C$ by $A$ (or alternatively, an extension of $A$ by $C$). The extension problem, when written as exact sequences, can be stated as finding all short exact sequences $0 \to A \xrightarrow{\psi} B \xrightarrow{\varphi} C \to 0$ with $A$ and $C$ fixed. Such an extension implies that $A \cong \psi(A)$ and $\psi(A)$ is the kernel of $\varphi$.

== Universal algebra ==
Kernels can be generalized in universal algebra for homomorphisms between any two algebraic structures. An operation on a set $A$ is a function of the form $Q:A^n \to A$, where $n$ is the arity (or rank) of the operation. An $n$-ary operation takes an ordered list of $n$ elements from $A$ and maps them to a single element in $A$. An algebraic structure is a tuple $\langle A, F \rangle$ where $A$ is the underlying set of the algebra, and $F$ is an indexed set of operations $Q \in F$ on $A$, with their interpretation denoted $Q^A$. The set indexing $F$ is the language, which also maps each operation symbol to their fixed arity (called the rank function). Two algebraic structures are similar when they share the same language, including their rank function.

Let $A$ and $B$ be algebraic structures of a similar type $F$. A homomorphism is a function $f: A \to B$ that respects the interpretation of each $Q \in F$, that is, taking $Q$ to be an $n$-ary operation, and $a_i \in A$ for $1 \leq i \leq n$:

$$f(Q^A(a_1, \ldots a_n)) = Q^B(f(a_1), \ldots f(a_n))$$

The kernel of $f$, denoted $\ker{f}$, is the subset of the direct product $A \times A$ consisting of all ordered pairs of elements of $A$ whose components are both mapped by $f$ to the same element in $B$. In symbols:

$$\ker f = \left\{\left(a, b\right) \in A \times A : f(a) = f\left(b\right)\right\}\mbox{.}$$

The homomorphism $f$ is injective if and only if its kernel is the diagonal set $\{ (a,a) \ | \ a \in A \}$, which is always contained inside the kernel. $\ker{f}$ is an equivalence relation on $A$, and in fact a congruence relation, meaning that for an n-ary operation $Q \in F$, the relation $(a_i, b_i) \in \ker{f}$ for $1 \leq i \leq n$ implies $(Q^A(a_1, \ldots a_n), Q^A(b_1, \ldots b_n)) \in \ker{f}$. It makes sense to speak of the quotient algebra $A/\ker{f}$, with the set consisting of the equivalence classes $a/\ker f$ of the kernel, and the well-defined operations defined for an $n$-ary operation $Q \in F$ as:

$$Q^{A/\ker{f}}(a_1/\ker{f}, \ldots a_n/\ker{f}) = Q^A(a_1, \ldots a_n)/\ker{f}$$

The first isomorphism theorem in universal algebra states that this quotient algebra is naturally isomorphic to the image of $f$ (which is a subalgebra of $B$).

== Category theory ==
=== Kernels of morphisms ===
Kernels can be generalized in categories that have zero objects. A category must satisfy having:

- Objects $A \in \bold{C}$
- Morphisms $f: A \to B$
- Composition; if $f: A \to B$ and $g: B \to C$, then denote their composition as $g \circ f: A \to C$
- Associativity: if $f: A \to B$, $g: B \to C$, and $h: C \to D$, then $h \circ (g \circ f) = (h \circ g) \circ f$
- An identity morphism $id_A: A \to A$ where composition with it results in the same morphism; for $f: A \to B$, $f = f \circ id_A = id_B \circ f$

A morphism $f: A \to B$ is an isomorphism when there exists a morphism $g: B \to A$ such that $g \circ f$ and $f \circ g$ are the identity morphisms. A zero object is an object of a category in which there exists exactly one morphism going to every object and exactly one morphism from every object. Any two zero objects are isomorphic to each other. If the zero object of a category is labeled $0$, then the composition of the morphisms $0: A \to 0 \to B$ is the $0$-morphism from $A$ to $B$.

The kernel of a morphism $f: B \to C$ is a morphism $i: A \to B$ that is universal to the property that $f \circ i = 0$. In other words, if there is a morphism $j: Z \to B$ with $f \circ j = 0$, then there exists a unique morphism $k: Z \to A$ such that $j = i \circ k$. This is illustrated in the commutative diagram:

The kernel is denoted as $\ker f \to B$. The kernel is the limit of the diagram $B \xrightarrow{f} C \xleftarrow{} 0$. By reversing the direction of the morphisms and compositions given in the definition of a kernel, this defines the notion of a cokernel, denoted as $\text{coker} f$. The image (category theory) of a morphism is defined as $\text{im} f = \ker (\text{coker} f)$ when the respective kernel/cokernel exist.

The notions of kernels/cokernels gives rise to the definition of an abelian category. A category is additive when it has a zero object, products for any two objects, and the morphisms between any two fixed objects form an abelian group with composition distributing over the addition on this group. Morphisms in an additive category may be called homomorphisms. An additive category is then called an abelian category when every homomorphism has a kernel and cokernel, every monomorphism is the kernel of its cokernel, and every epimorphism is the cokernel of its kernel.

=== Equalizer ===
Kernels of morphisms can be generalized by the notion of an equalizer. An equalizer for two morphism $f, g: A \to B$ in a category is an object $E$ and a morphism $e: E \to A$ such that $f \circ e = g \circ e$, and moverover it is universal with respect to this property; if $z: Z \to A$ is another morphism with $f \circ z = g \circ z$, then there exists a unique morphism $u: Z \to E$ such that $z = e \circ u$. Any equalizer morphism must be monic; if $x, y: Z \to E$ with $e \circ x = e \circ y$, then $x=y$.

For abelian groups, the equalizer of two homomorphisms is the same as the equalizer between the difference of these two homomorphisms and the zero homomorphism, so the only equalizers that are needed to be considered in the category of abelian groups are the ones between any homomorphism $h: A \to B$ and the zero homomorphism $0: A \to B$. The object of such an equalizer is (up to isomorphism) $\ker h$, the kernel of the homomorphism $h$, and the associated morphism is the inclusion map. This example illustrates that equalizers are a generalization of a kernel of a morphism, in particular, the kernel of a morphism is the equalizer between the morphism with the respective zero morphism.

=== Kernel pairs ===
The kernel pair of a morphism $f: X \to Y$ is defined as the pullback on this morphism paired with itself. It can be visualized with the commutative diagram:

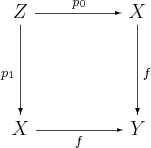

=== Kernels of functors ===
Functors between categories can also have a kernel. A (covariant) functor from a category $\bold{C}$ to $\bold{D}$, denoted $F: \bold{C} \to \bold{D}$, maps objects and morphisms from $\bold{C}$ to $\bold{D}$ such that the following hold:

1. If $f: A \to B$, then $F(f): F(A) \to F(B)$
2. $F(g \circ f) = F(g) \circ F(f)$
3. $F(id_A) = id_{F(A)}$

A congruence on a category $\bold{C}$ is an equivalence relation $\sim$ on morphisms where $f \sim g$ implies they share the same domain and codomain, and furthermore $bfa \sim bga$ for any applicable morphisms $a$ and $b$. A congruence gives rise to an associated congruence category $\bold{C}^\sim$ with the same objects as $\bold{C}$ but with morphisms consisting of $\langle f, g \rangle$ where $f \sim g$, composition being defined componentwise, and the identity morphism being $\widetilde{id_A} = \langle id_A, id_A \rangle$. Then a quotient category $\bold{C}/\sim$ can be formed, where the objects are again the same as $\bold{C}$, the morphisms are the equivalence classes $[f]$ under the congruence, the identity morphism being its associated equivalence class $[id_A]$, and composition defined as $[g] \circ [f] = [g \circ f]$. There are two projection functors from the congruence category to the original category, labeled as $p_1, p_2$, and there is a quotient functor $\pi$ from the category to its quotient category acting as the coequalizer (Note: A coequalizer is defined the same way as an equalizer but with the morphism directions reversed.) of the two projection functors.

A functor $F: \bold{C} \to \bold{D}$ gives a congruence $\sim_F$ where $f \sim_F g$ if and only if they share the same domain and codomain, and furthermore $F(f) = F(g)$. The kernel of $F$ is then denoted as the associated congruence category $\ker F = \bold{C}^{\sim_F}$.

== See also ==
- Kernel of a function
- Zero set

== Sources ==
- Awodey, Steve (2006). Category theory. Oxford : Oxford; New York: Clarendon Press; Oxford University Press. ISBN 978-0-19-856861-2.
- Axler, Sheldon. Linear Algebra Done Right (4th ed.). Springer.
- Burris, Stanley; Sankappanavar, H.P. (2012). A Course in Universal Algebra (Millennium ed.). S. Burris and H.P. Sankappanavar. ISBN 978-0-9880552-0-9.
- Dummit, David Steven; Foote, Richard M. (2004). Abstract algebra (3rd ed.). Hoboken, NJ: Wiley. ISBN 978-0-471-43334-7.
- Fraleigh, John B.; Katz, Victor (2003). A first course in abstract algebra. World student series (7th ed.). Boston: Addison-Wesley. ISBN 978-0-201-76390-4.
- Hungerford, Thomas W. (2014). Abstract Algebra: an introduction (3rd ed.). Boston, MA: Brooks/Cole, Cengage Learning. ISBN 978-1-111-56962-4.
- McKenzie, Ralph; McNulty, George F.; Taylor, W. (1987). Algebras, lattices, varieties. The Wadsworth & Brooks/Cole mathematics series. Monterey, Calif: Wadsworth & Brooks/Cole Advanced Books & Software. ISBN 978-0-534-07651-1.
- Riehl, Emily. Category Theory in Context. Dover Publications.
- Rotman, Joseph J. (2002). Advanced modern algebra. Upper Saddle River, NJ: Prentice Hall. ISBN 0130878685.
- Vakil, Ravi (2024). "The Rising Sea: Foundations of Algebraic Geometry" (PDF).
