= Normal morphism =

Type of morphism

In category theory and its applications to mathematics, a normal monomorphism or conormal epimorphism is a particularly well-behaved type of morphism. A normal category is a category in which every monomorphism is normal. A conormal category is one in which every epimorphism is conormal.

== Definition ==
A monomorphism is normal if it is the kernel of some morphism, and an epimorphism is conormal if it is the cokernel of some morphism.

A category C is binormal if it's both normal and conormal. But note that some authors will use the word "normal" only to indicate that C is binormal.

== Examples ==
In the category of groups, a monomorphism f from H to G is normal if and only if its image is a normal subgroup of G. In particular, if H is a subgroup of G, then the inclusion map i from H to G is a monomorphism, and will be normal if and only if H is a normal subgroup of G. In fact, this is the origin of the term "normal" for monomorphisms.

On the other hand, every epimorphism in the category of groups is conormal (since it is the cokernel of its own kernel), so this category is conormal.

In an abelian category, every monomorphism is the kernel of its cokernel, and every epimorphism is the cokernel of its kernel. Thus, abelian categories are always binormal. The category of abelian groups is the fundamental example of an abelian category, and accordingly every subgroup of an abelian group is a normal subgroup.
