= Group homomorphism =

Mathematical function between groups that preserves multiplication structure

Depiction of a group homomorphism (h) from G (left) to H (right). The oval inside H is the image of h. N is the kernel of h and aN is a coset of N.

In mathematics, given two groups, (G,∗) and (H, ·), a group homomorphism from (G,∗) to (H, ·) is a function h : G → H such that for all u and v in G it holds that

$$h(u*v) = h(u) \cdot h(v)$$

where the group operation on the left side of the equation is that of G and on the right side that of H.

From this property, one can deduce that h maps the identity element e_{G} of G to the identity element e_{H} of H,

$$h(e_G) = e_H$$

and it also maps inverses to inverses in the sense that

$$h\left(u^{-1}\right) = h(u)^{-1}. \,$$

Hence one can say that h "is compatible with the group structure".

In areas of mathematics where one considers groups endowed with additional structure, a homomorphism sometimes means a map that respects not only the group structure (as above) but also the extra structure. For example, a homomorphism of topological groups is often required to be continuous.

== Properties ==
Let $e_{H}$ be the identity element of the group (H, ·) and $u \in G$, then

$$h(u) \cdot e_{H} = h(u) = h(u*e_{G}) = h(u) \cdot h(e_{G})$$

Now by multiplying by the inverse of $h(u)$ (or applying the cancellation rule) we obtain

$$e_{H} = h(e_{G})$$

Similarly,

$$e_H = h(e_G) = h(u*u^{-1}) = h(u)\cdot h(u^{-1})$$

Therefore, by the uniqueness of the inverse: $h(u^{-1}) = h(u)^{-1}$.

== Types ==
Monomorphism
A group homomorphism that is injective (or, one-to-one); i.e., preserves distinctness.
Epimorphism
A group homomorphism that is surjective (or, onto); i.e., reaches every point in the codomain.
Isomorphism
A group homomorphism that is bijective; i.e., injective and surjective. Its inverse is also a group homomorphism. In this case, the groups G and H are called isomorphic; they differ only in the notation of their elements (except of identity element) and are identical for all practical purposes. I.e. we re-label all elements except identity.
Endomorphism
A group homomorphism, h: G → G; the domain and codomain are the same. Also called an endomorphism of G.
Automorphism
A group endomorphism that is bijective, and hence an isomorphism. The set of all automorphisms of a group G, with functional composition as operation, itself forms a group, the automorphism group of G. It is denoted by Aut(G). As an example, the automorphism group of (Z, +) contains only two elements, the identity transformation and multiplication with −1; it is isomorphic to (Z/2Z, +).

== Image and kernel ==
We define the kernel of h to be the set of elements in G that are mapped to the identity in H

$$\operatorname{ker}(h) := \left\{u \in G\colon h(u) = e_{H}\right\}.$$

and the image of h to be

$$\operatorname{im}(h) := h(G) \equiv \left\{h(u)\colon u \in G\right\}.$$

The kernel and image of a homomorphism can be interpreted as measuring how close it is to being an isomorphism. The first isomorphism theorem states that the image of a group homomorphism, h(G) is isomorphic to the quotient group G/ker h.

The kernel of h is a normal subgroup of G. Assume $u \in \operatorname{ker}(h)$ and show $g^{-1} \circ u \circ g \in \operatorname{ker}(h)$ for arbitrary $u, g$:

$$\begin{align}
h\left(g^{-1} \circ u \circ g\right) &= h(g)^{-1} \cdot h(u) \cdot h(g) \\
&= h(g)^{-1} \cdot e_H  \cdot h(g) \\
&= h(g)^{-1} \cdot h(g) = e_H,
\end{align}$$

The image of h is a subgroup of H.

The homomorphism, h, is a group monomorphism; i.e., h is injective (one-to-one) if and only if ker(h) = {e_{G}}. Injectivity directly gives that there is a unique element in the kernel, and, conversely, a unique element in the kernel gives injectivity:

$$\begin{align}
&&                           h(g_1) &= h(g_2) \\
\Leftrightarrow &&         h(g_1) \cdot h(g_2)^{-1} &= e_H \\
\Leftrightarrow && h\left(g_1 \circ g_2^{-1}\right) &= e_H,\  \operatorname{ker}(h) = \{e_G\} \\
\Rightarrow     &&               g_1 \circ g_2^{-1} &= e_G \\
\Leftrightarrow &&                              g_1 &= g_2
\end{align}$$

== Examples ==
- Consider the cyclic group Z_{3} = (Z/3Z, +) = ({0, 1, 2}, +) and the group of integers (Z, +). The map h : Z → Z/3Z with h(u) = u mod 3 is a group homomorphism. It is surjective and its kernel consists of all integers that are divisible by 3.
- The set
  $$G \equiv \left\{\begin{pmatrix}
a & b \\
0 & 1
\end{pmatrix} \bigg| a > 0, b \in \mathbf{R}\right\}$$
  forms a group under matrix multiplication. For any complex number u, the function f_{u} : G → C^{*} defined by
  $$\begin{pmatrix}
a & b \\
0 & 1
\end{pmatrix} \mapsto a^u$$
  is a group homomorphism.
- Consider a multiplicative group of positive real numbers (R^{+}, ⋅). For any complex number u, the function f_{u} : R^{+} → C^{*} defined by
  $$f_u(a) = a^u$$
  is a group homomorphism.
- The exponential map yields a group homomorphism from the group of real numbers R with addition to the group of non-zero real numbers R* with multiplication. The kernel is {0} and the image consists of the positive real numbers.
- The exponential map also yields a group homomorphism from the group of complex numbers C with addition to the group of non-zero complex numbers C* with multiplication. This map is surjective and has the kernel {2πki : k ∈ Z}, as can be seen from Euler's formula. Fields like R and C that have homomorphisms from their additive group to their multiplicative group are thus called exponential fields.
- The function $\Phi: (\mathbb{Z}, +) \rightarrow (\mathbb{R}, +)$, defined by $\Phi(x) = \sqrt[]{2}x$ is a homomorphism.
- Consider the two groups $(\mathbb{R}^+, *)$ and $(\mathbb{R}, +)$, represented respectively by $G$ and $H$, where $\mathbb{R}^+$ is the positive real numbers. Then, the function $f: G \rightarrow H$ defined by the logarithm function is a homomorphism.

== Category of groups ==
If h : G → H and k : H → K are group homomorphisms, then so is k ∘ h : G → K. This shows that the class of all groups, together with group homomorphisms as morphisms, forms a category (specifically the category of groups).

== Homomorphisms of abelian groups ==
If G and H are abelian (i.e., commutative) groups, then the set Hom(G, H) of all group homomorphisms from G to H is itself an abelian group: the sum h + k of two homomorphisms is defined by

(h + k)(u) = h(u) + k(u) for all u in G.

The commutativity of H is needed to prove that h + k is again a group homomorphism.

The addition of homomorphisms is compatible with the composition of homomorphisms in the following sense: if f is in Hom(K, G), h, k are elements of Hom(G, H), and g is in Hom(H, L), then

(h + k) ∘ f = (h ∘ f) + (k ∘ f) and g ∘ (h + k) = (g ∘ h) + (g ∘ k).

Since the composition is associative, this shows that the set End(G) of all endomorphisms of an abelian group forms a ring, the endomorphism ring of G. For example, the endomorphism ring of the abelian group consisting of the direct sum of m copies of Z/nZ is isomorphic to the ring of m-by-m matrices with entries in Z/nZ. The above compatibility also shows that the category of all abelian groups with group homomorphisms forms a preadditive category; the existence of direct sums and well-behaved kernels makes this category the prototypical example of an abelian category.

== See also ==
- Homomorphism
- Fundamental theorem on homomorphisms
- Quasimorphism
- Ring homomorphism
