= List of fictitious people =

Fictitious people are nonexistent people, who, unlike fictional characters, have been claimed to actually exist. Usually this is done as a practical joke or hoax, but sometimes fictitious people are 'created' as part of a fraud. A pseudonym may also be considered by some to be a "fictitious person", although this is not the correct definition.

== Hoaxes ==
- William Ashbless, a 19th-century fictitious poet and adventurer.
- Bilitis, nonexistent Ancient Greek poet. Supposed author of The Songs of Bilitis, a collection of erotic poetry "discovered" by Pierre Louÿs.
- Achmet Borumborad, a late 18th-century quack doctor and businessman in Dublin, purportedly from Constantinople.
- George P. Burdell, eternal Georgia Tech student.
- Eddie Burrup, fake Australian aboriginal painter.
- Johnny "The Celestial Comet" Chung, supposed Chinese-American college football player for the nonexistent Plainfield Teachers College.
- Allegra Coleman, nonexistent supermodel.
- Tom Collins, fictitious gossip and namesake of the gin-and-lemon-based cocktail.
- Helen Demidenko, nonexistent Ukrainian author, created by Australian writer Helen Darville.
- Aimi Eguchi, fictional Japanese idol. Member of idol group AKB48 created as a composite of the other members.
- Frederick R. Ewing, nonexistent author of I, Libertine.
- Hugo N. Frye, a fictional figure, purportedly the founder of the Republican Party in New York State, made up by Cornell University students in 1930 as a prank designed to embarrass several state politicians.
- Anthony Godby Johnson, (probably) fictitious terminally-ill abused author of Rock and a Hard Place: One Boy's Triumphant Story.
- Kaycee Nicole, fictional leukemia sufferer and Internet personality.
- Kilroy, a nonexistent legendary World War II US Army major who inspired millions during the war and became part of American popular culture.
- Ern Malley, nonexistent avant-garde Australian poet, created by Australian poets James McAuley and Harold Stewart.
- Lillian Virginia Mountweazel, a photographer who existed as a fictitious entry in the 4th edition of the New Columbia Encyclopedia. The publishers assumed that if they caught another encyclopedia containing their copyright trap, the presence of the non-existent Mountweazel would prove that their competitors hadn’t done any original research and copied them.
- Father Pat Noise, alleged Irish priest and IRA member.
- Lucian Yahoo Dragoman, a nonexistent baby supposedly named after Yahoo!
- Karyl Robin-Evans, nonexistent scientist whose expedition is chronicled in the book Sungods in Exile.
- H. Rochester Sneath, nonexistent English public school headmaster and prolific letter writer, created by Humphry Berkeley.
- Georg Paul Thomann, nonexistent Austrian conceptual artist, created by art group monochrom to represent Austria at the 2002 Sao Paulo Art Biennial. Georg Paul Thomann is featured in RE/Search's "Pranks 2" book.
- Piotr Zak, nonexistent Polish-born avant-garde composer, whose music was created for a BBC radio programme by Susan Bradshaw and Hans Keller.

== Pseudonyms ==
This list includes pseudonyms supplied with a biography suggesting the existence of a person distinct from the actual person with the pseudonym in question, often with the purpose of a hoax.

See also Category:Collective pseudonyms (many of them were not claimed as "real" people).

- Penelope Ashe, supposed "demure Long Island housewife" who authored Naked Came The Stranger. Actually a pseudonym of a collective of writers, and portrayed by one of their relatives during interviews.
- Richard Bachman, a pseudonym of Stephen King, given a fake biography and author photo.
- Silence Dogood, a false persona used by Benjamin Franklin to get his work published.
- Roderick Jaynes, editor of all the films of Joel and Ethan Coen. Actually a pseudonym for the Coens themselves. "Jaynes", supposedly a cantankerous Englishman in his 80s, has also penned a dismissive introduction to a book of the Coens' scripts, and an article in The Guardian discussing his work on The Man Who Wasn't There.
- Kozma Prutkov, arrogant Russian writer and government official, who published bombastic pieces that ended up being satirical commentary on Russian bureaucracy. A creation of 4 Russian writers, including Aleksey Konstantinovich Tolstoy (1817-1875) and Alexei Zhemchuzhnikov.
- Lemony Snicket, a pseudonym used by Daniel Handler for his A Series of Unfortunate Events. Snicket, who is also a character in the books, is the meta-fictional narrator of the series.
- Wrench Tuttle, an Atlanta-based "poet, traveler, activist and philosopher". Canadian musician/composer Bob Wiseman "collaborated" with lyricist Tuttle by mail, for the 1989 album In Her Dream: Bob Wiseman Sings Wrench Tuttle. Tuttle was, in reality, Wiseman.
- Kilgore Trout originally was a character created by Kurt Vonnegut, who later became a pseudonym used by Philip José Farmer to publish, as a homage to Vonnegut, an actual version of one of the fictional Trout's books, Venus on the Half-Shell (1975). Farmer's work is based on a moment in Vonnegut's God Bless You, Mr. Rosewater that describes a character reading a copy of Trout's novel, "Venus on the Half-Shell". Vonnegut was not happy about the publication of Farmer's book, but he declined to sue over the use of his intellectual property.
- Gerald Wiley, authorial pseudonym used by sketch comedy performer Ronnie Barker on shows in which he was a performer. Initially, even other writers on the show were unaware that sketches submitted by "Wiley" were in fact written by Barker; Barker wanted his sketches to be judged on merit, not on the fact he was a cast member or star.
- Andrew MacDonald, a pseudonym for William Luther Pierce, white supremacist and author of The Turner Diaries.

== Academia ==
- Arthur Besse, pseudonym used since 1978 by French differential geometers
- Blanche Descartes, fictitious mathematician with over 30 published papers
- Claude Émile Jean-Baptiste Litre, volumetric namesake.
- Dr. Irving Joshua Matrix, numerologist, invented by Martin Gardner
- G. W. Peck, pseudonym used by several mathematicians since 1979
- H. Rochester Sneath, nonexistent headmaster of the nonexistent Selhurst School
- Honorable J. Fortescue, fake US physician
- Jára Cimrman, fictional Czech genius and polymath
- John Rainwater, enrolled by mathematics graduate students at the University of Washington in 1952 as a prank; has since been used as a pseudonym by several other mathematicians for published work
- Josiah Carberry, professor of psychoceramics at Brown University
- Nicolas Bourbaki, a 20th-century French mathematician with credited publications
- Peter Orno, associated with Ohio State University and credited with several papers in mathematics during the 20th century

== Arts and entertainment ==
- Alan Smithee, name used by film directors who wish to disown a project.
- Andreas Karavis, nonexistent Greek poet.
- Araki Yasusada, fake Hiroshima survivor and author
- B. Traven, adventure novelist.
- Borat Sagdiyev, a fictitious Kazakhstani journalist created by Sacha Baron Cohen, see also Ali G and Brüno Gehard.
- Carl Brandon, a fictional science fiction fan of color, for whom the Carl Brandon Society was named
- Conchita (previously Conchita Wurst), stage persona of Austrian recording artist Thomas Neuwirth.
- C.W. Blubberhouse, whose letters in UK national newspapers were exposed as a hoax by the Sunday Times.
- Dame Edna Everage and Sir Les Patterson, characters played by Australian comedian Barry Humphries.
- Darko Maver, a lauded fictional Yugoslav artist whose gruesome sculptures turned out to be photos of real murders found on rotten.com by Eva and Franco Mattes.
- David J. Broadfoot, the Member of Parliament from Kicking Horse Pass, representing the New Apathetic Party, a character played by Canadian comedian Dave Broadfoot.
- David Manning, a nonexistent film critic created by Sony Corporation.
- Donald Kaufman, fictional brother of Adaptation writer Charlie Kaufman, gained "writing credits" and was nominated for an Oscar.
- Edna Welthorpe, fictitious small-minded critic of modern theatre and moral decline, created by Joe Orton.
- George Spelvin, traditional pseudonyms used in programs in American theater.
- Gerald Bostock, writer of the lyrics for the Jethro Tull album Thick as a Brick.
- Hajime Yadate, credited as the creator of most of the anime works of Japanese animation studio Sunrise.
- Henry Root, fictitious correspondent, and Henry Raddick (possibly the same person)
- JT LeRoy, fictional American author and literary celebrity.
- Kodee Kennings, nonexistent 8-year-old girl whose letters were published in the Daily Egyptian, a student newspaper for Southern Illinois University Carbondale
- Lily Savage, a character played by British comedian Paul O'Grady.
- Margaret B. Jones, fictitious half-white, half-Native American foster child and Bloods gang member in South Central Los Angeles
- Mary Anne Jackson, a fictitious jazz pianist created by comedian and musician Steve Allen.
- Mrs. Trellis of North Wales, a regular correspondent to BBC radio comedy I'm Sorry I Haven't A Clue
- Nat Tate, fake 1950s American artist
- Ossian, Irish bard created by James Macpherson in the 18th century
- P. D. Q. Bach, a fictional composer invented by musical satirist "Professor" Peter Schickele.
- Ponsonby Britt, executive producer of The Rocky and Bullwinkle Show. In the credits of George of the Jungle, a later offering from the same production company, Britt had been promoted to "Ponsonby Britt OBE" (recipient of the Order of the British Empire).
- Rrose Sélavy, a fictional artist created by Marcel Duchamp
- S. Morgenstern, fictional author from the equally fictional country of Florin
- Super Dave Osborne, a character played by American comedian and actor Bob Einstein.
- Sven, an occasional stand-in for Samantha on BBC radio comedy I'm Sorry I Haven't A Clue.
- Tony Clifton, imaginary lounge singer created (and usually played) by comedian Andy Kaufman
- Van den Budenmayer, nonexistent Dutch composer believed to be real by some filmgoers even after they were told the truth.
- Walter Plinge, name used by British stage actors who wish to stay anonymous
- Wanda Koolmatrie, nonexistent Australian aboriginal author

== Commercial mascots ==
- Aunt Jemima, fictional advertising character for the Aunt Jemima brand of pancake mix and syrup; the role was portrayed by multiple actresses in promotional appearances.
- Betty Crocker, fake spokesperson for The Washburn Crosby Company of Minneapolis and its successor company, General Mills
- Mavis Beacon, fictitious typing tutor created for the Mavis Beacon Teaches Typing application software.
- Rastus, fictional African-American chef character used as the mascot for Cream of Wheat.
- Uncle Ben, advertising persona for Uncle Ben's rice, now Ben's Original; Mars said in 2020 that it did not know whether a real "Ben" had ever existed.

== Crime ==
- Clay Bertrand, an alleged alias associated with two people connected to various investigations regarding the assassination of President John F. Kennedy
- Prawo Jazdy, alleged Polish traffic offender in Ireland, due to misreading of the header of Polish driving licences
- Phantom of Heilbronn, nonexistent German serial killer wrongly linked to many extremely varied crimes by flawed DNA analysis.
- R. M. Qualtrough, a key figure in the murder trial of William Herbert Wallace
- Sahil Omar, a fictitious migrant linked to several mass shootings and disasters in the United States

== Military ==
- Major William Martin, RM, a dead courier found floating off the coast of Spain possessing documents outlining future Allied strategy. The documents were misinformation planted by the Security Service as part of Operation Mincemeat, a World War II deception plan to cover the invasion of Sicily.
- Titusz Dugovics, the hero of Belgrade

== Politics ==
- Andre Kasongo Ilunga, a member of the UNAFEC party and Minister of National Economy and Trade of the Democratic Republic of the Congo in 2007.
- Jakob Maria Mierscheid, a member of the German Bundestag. Despite not existing, Mierscheid has an official Parliamentary biography (complete with portrait) and has given his name to a bridge spanning the River Spree and to the Mierscheid Law, which has been used to predict voting patterns in the former West Germany.
- Pope Donus II, a Pope accidentally created by the misalignment and misunderstanding of papal listings that allegedly served sometime in the 970s

== Sports ==
- Masal Bugduv, nonexistent 16-year-old Moldovan football player linked with a move to numerous top clubs in Europe.
- Lennay Kekua, nonexistent deceased girlfriend of former Notre Dame linebacker Manti Te'o.
- Sidd Finch, nonexistent baseball prodigy created by George Plimpton for an April Fool's Day prank.
- Sugimin Hidayatullah, nonexistent Indonesian football player who is rumored to be brought to Real Madrid by José Mourinho. It started with his arrival in Indonesia to be a commentator at one of the UEFA Euro 2012 matches at RCTI. His presence was alluded to by football observer, Pangeran Siahaan, via his tweet on the account Twitter (X) with the username @pangeransiahaan who stated that Real Madrid is interested in bringing in the player from Indonesia for €7 million (IDR 117.9 billion).
- Taro Tsujimoto, nonexistent Japanese hockey player selected by Buffalo Sabres general manager Punch Imlach in the 1974 NHL Draft.
- Matts Kunding, possibly nonexistent Irish association footballer.
