= Matts =

Matts is a male given name. Notable people with this name include:

== Surname ==
- Alfred Matts (1893–1970), English cricket player
- Peter W. Matts (1814–1903), American politician

== Given name ==
- Matts Björk (1867–1936), Finnish lawyer and politician
- Matts Dumell (born 1952), Finnish journalist
- Matts Kunding, Irish football player
- Matts Kurck, also known as Matti Kurki, Finnish chieftain
- Matts Olsson (born 1988), Swedish alpine ski racer
