= Dropa stones =

Purported extraterrestrial artifacts

The Dropa stones (Note: Sometimes spelled as Dzopa, Dzhopa, Dropas, or Drop-ka.) are purported set of 716 granite discs inscribed with unknown markings. These pseudoarcheological artifacts are claimed to be a series of 12,000-year old accounts of an extraterrestrial crash landing on Earth.

Extensive inquiries have found no record of the stones being displayed in any of the world's museums, nor of the existence of any person allegedly involved with their discovery and translation. French ufologist Jacques Vallée considers the tale to be a hoax. Further fictional details were added over time and appear in more recent retellings of the story.

== The tale ==
According to what may be the earliest version of the tale, which appeared in July 1962 in the German magazine Das vegetarische Universum, in 1937 an archeological expedition in the Bayan Har mountains led by Chi Pu Tei found 716 granite discs with tiny hieroglyph-like markings, dated to 12,000 years before present. Star maps and remains with thin bodies and unusually large heads were also present at the site. After more than two decades of work at the "Academy of Prehistory" in Beijing, Chinese archeologists and linguists allegedly managed to translate the markings and concluded that the discs had been carved by extraterrestrials in the aftermath of their crash in the Sino-Tibetan border region. These conclusions were published by Tsum Um Nui in an academic journal, but were met with ridicule. Tsum then left for Japan in self-imposed exile and died shortly after. The discs are sometimes claimed to measure up to 1 foot (30 cm) in diameter and carry two grooves in the form of a double spiral originating from a hole in the center, with hieroglyphs inscribed within the grooves and visible with a magnifying glass.

In 1966 the story was republished by Vyacheslav Zaitsev in the Soviet magazine Sputnik. Zaitsev added that several discs had been shipped to Moscow on request of Soviet researchers, who discovered that they contained a large amount of cobalt and other metals, that they behaved as electrical conductors, and that they produced a humming sound when placed on a special turntable.

Supposedly, in 1974 Austrian engineer Ernst Wegerer (or Wegener) visited the Banpo Museum in Xi'an, Shaanxi, where he saw two of the Dropa stones. It is said that he inquired about the discs but received no information, although he was allowed to take one in his hand and photograph them up close. By 1994 the discs could no longer be found.

== Controversy ==
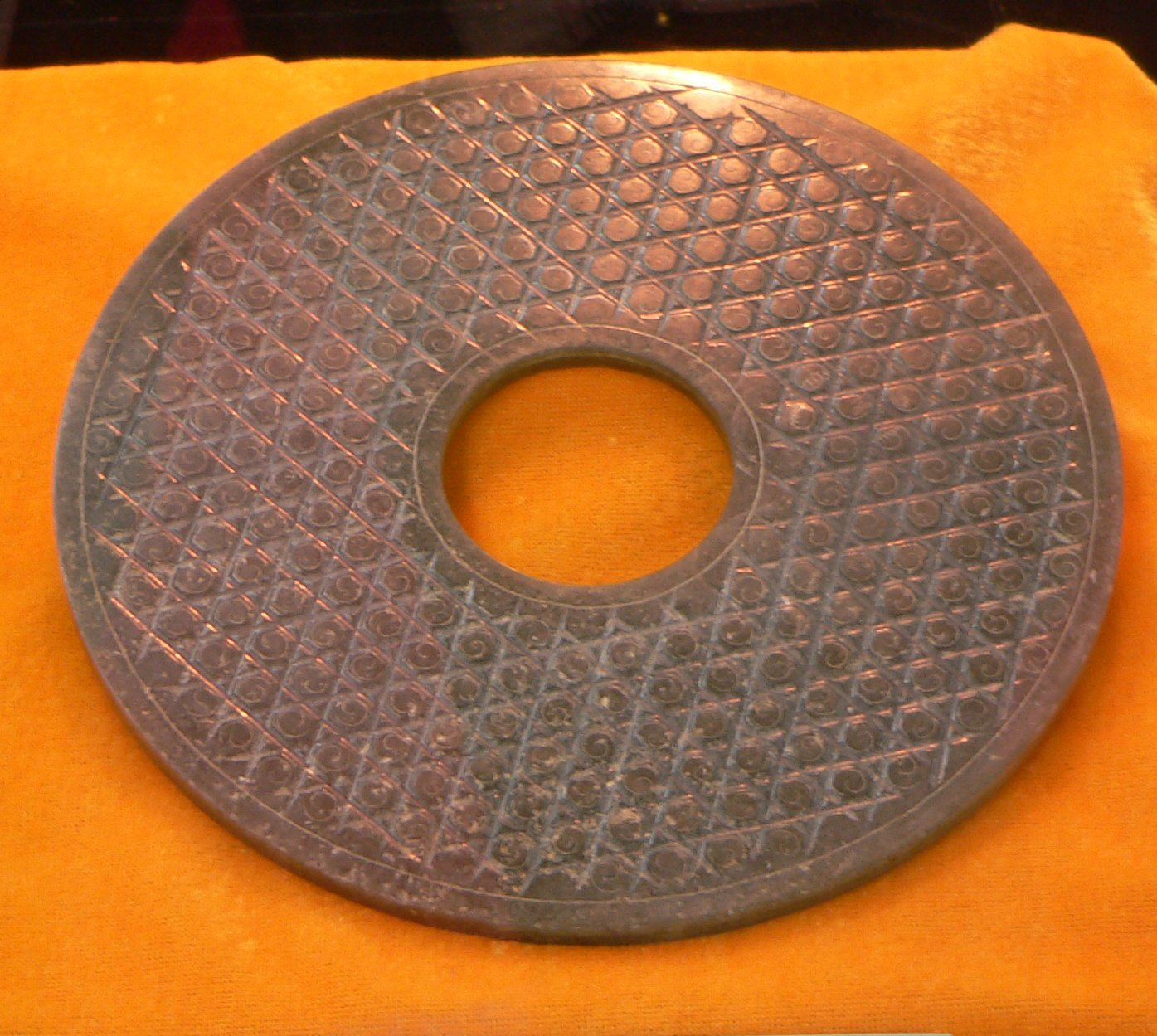
A Han-era bì (璧), 16 centimetres (6.3 in) in diameter.

The original rendition of the story, as it appeared in Das vegetarische Universum, was credited to Reinhardt Wegemann, although no German writer with this name can be found. The article cites a DINA news agency in Tokyo, which has left no trace.

Outside of subsequent retellings of the tale of the Dropa stones no mention has been found of Chu Pu Tei or Tsum Um Nui, or of their academic work. It has also been suggested that neither is a real Chinese name, although starting from the 2000s they are sometimes rendered as Qu Futai and Chen Wenming, respectively.

The 1978 book Sungods in Exile by David Agamon (real name David A. Gamon), which purported to be an account of a 1947 expedition by scientist Karyl Robin-Evans in the Bayan Har region, added further details to the story. In the book Robin-Evans meets the Dropa, a dwarfish indigenous people of a few hundred members, and learns that their distant ancestors had come from a planet in the "Sirius constellation" and had settled in the region after being stranded by mechanical problems. Gamon later revealed that the entire book was a hoax and satire, although details from Sungods in Exile continue to be presented as factual in some retellings.

Wegerer's supposed photos of two of the stones are too low in resolution to show the hieroglyphs and look to be bì discs. Bì are round jade discs with holes in their centers. When buried in the earth, the minerals change them to be multi-colored. Bì have been dated to 3000 BCE and were common in what is now Shaanxi. Some bì are decorated with parallel grooves and other markings.
