= Jakob Mierscheidt Bridge =

Jakob-Mierscheidt Bridge
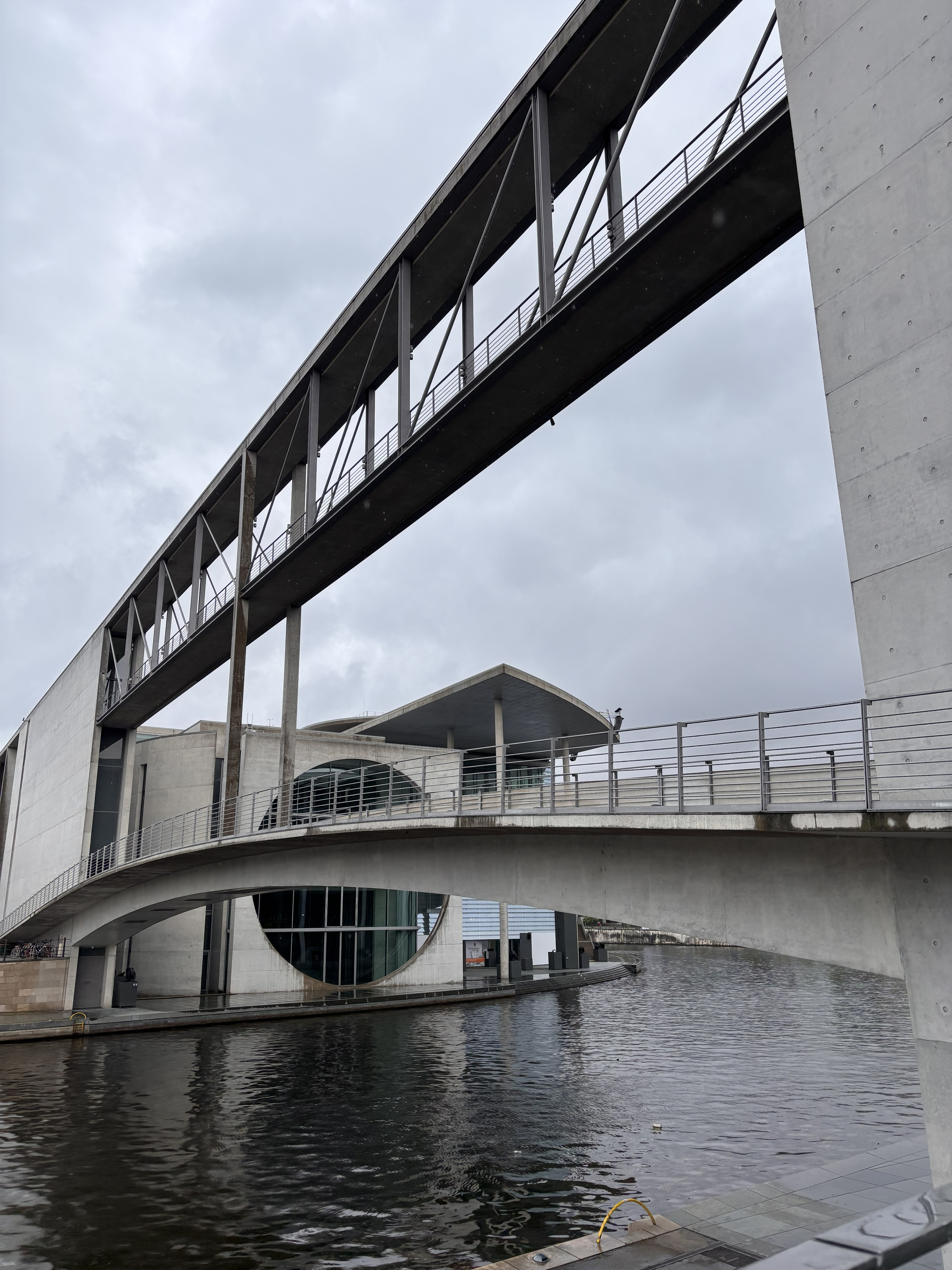
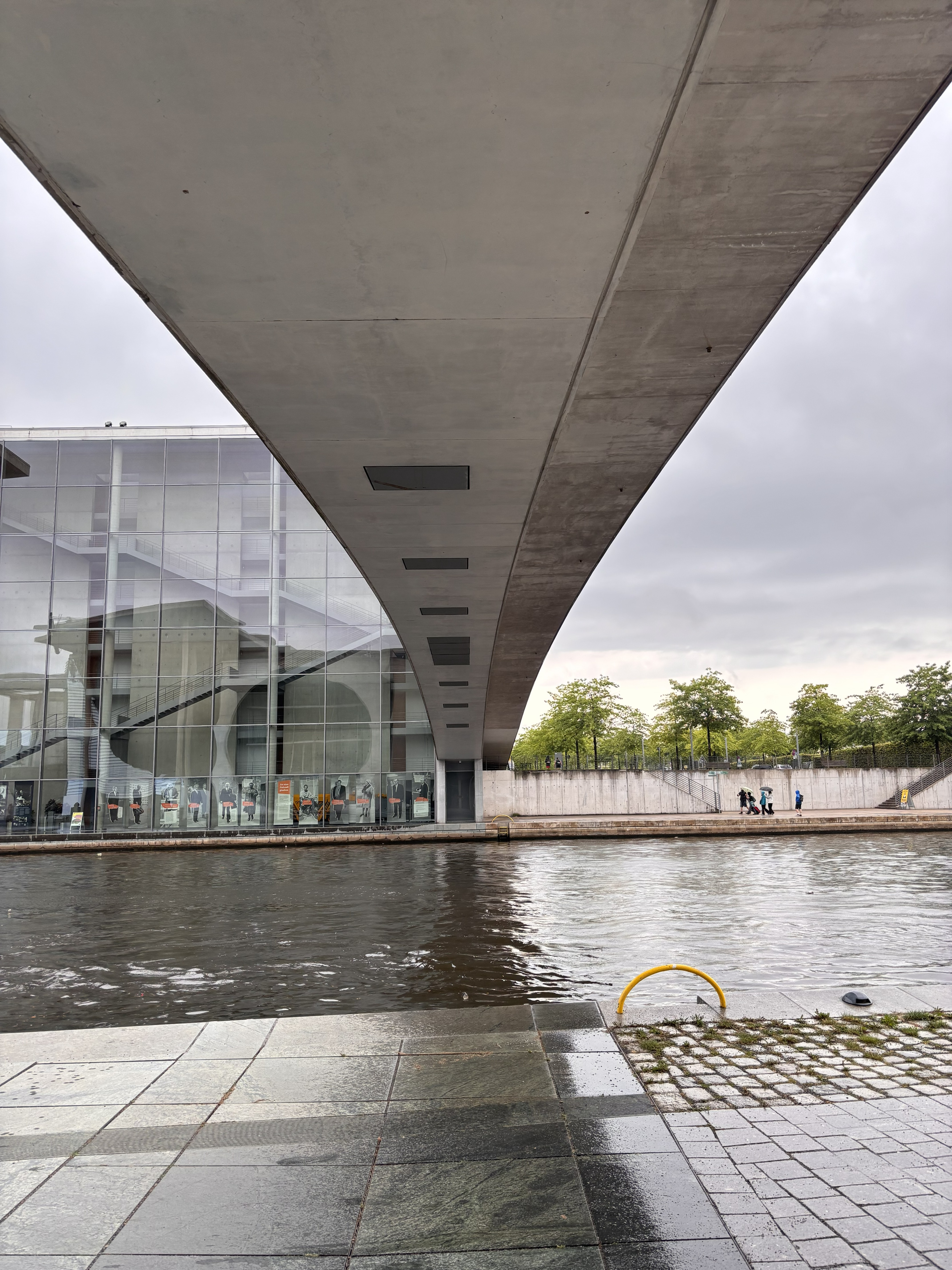
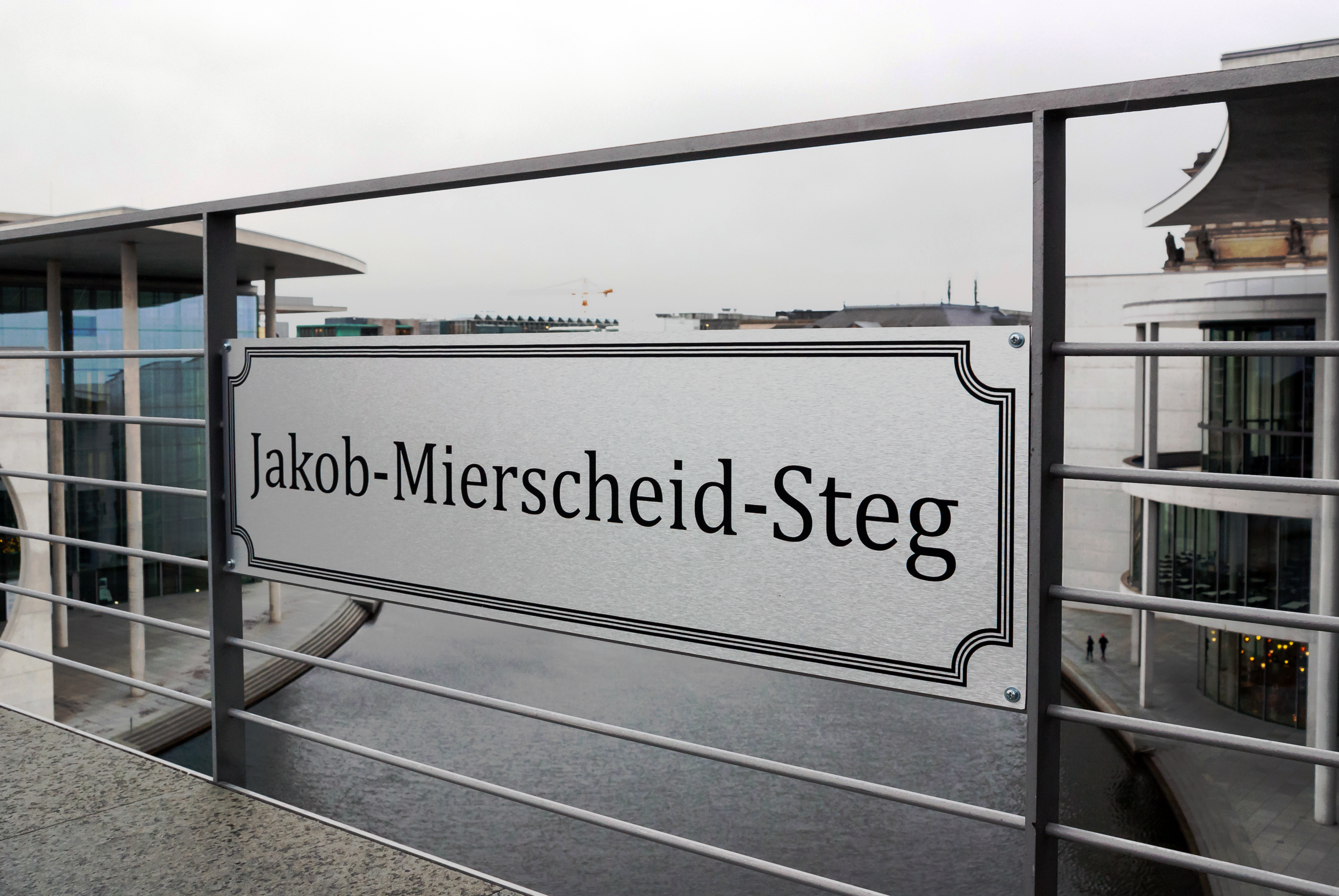
- Jakob-Mierscheidt Bridge (above) and Marie-Elisabeth-Lüders Bridge (below) The under carrriage of the Marie-Elisabeth-Lüders Bridge, made from pressed concrete. Jakob-Mierscheidt Steg (Bridge) sign
- Coordinates: 52°31′14″N 13°22′35″E
- Carries: Politicians and bicycles
- Crosses: Spree (river)
- Locale: Berlin, Germany

Location
- Interactive map of Jakob-Mierscheidt Bridge

The Jakob-Mierscheidt Bridge (steg) is one of the popular names for the upper bridge that crosses the Spree Canal. This double decker pedestrian bridge connects the committee rooms and parliamentary offices with the parliament's scientific service center. The lower bridge has a gentle arc and is attached to two horizontal steel trusses above it. The upper truss bridge has a weather protection roof and connects the sixth floors of the Paul-Löbe-Haus (PLH) with the Marie-Elisabeth-Lüders-Haus (MELH) on the Spreebogen (Spree bend). The railing of the upper bridge once had the inscription Jakob-Mierscheid-Steg. The bridge is also called the "higher civil service career path". On Google maps, the bridge is named after the reclusive, but esteemed SPD parliamentarian Jakob Mierscheid. The upper bridge is only for parliamentarians. The lower bridge is open for everybody.
