= Fictitious person =

Fictitious person may refer to:

- Persona ficta: Legal person
- Anyone in List of fictitious people
