= Jack Kimble =

Fictional character and social media account

- AI-generated profile picture used by @RepJackKimble

In-universe information
- Occupation: U.S. representative for California's 54th congressional district
- Affiliation: Republican Party

Jack Kimble, also known by his X username @RepJackKimble, is a fictional and satirical character active on the social media websites X and Bluesky. Presented as a Republican member of the United States House of Representatives, his character has also been used as a novelty candidate. Several of the account's posts have gone viral and mistakenly thought to have been posted by a legitimate American politician.

== Description ==
On his personal website, the person behind the Kimble account says he is a retired educator for Chicago Public Schools. In the 1990s, he paricipated in the Chicago improv comedy scene, and in March 2025, began performing stand-up comedy.

Created in June 2009, Kimble is presented as a Republican congressman from California's fictional 54th congressional district (California currently has 52 congressional districts, and has never had more than 53). In the account's early years, corporate logos were placed beside the account. A book, Detective Jesus #1: Thou Shalt Not Kill, was published under the Kimble alias.

In his Twitter bio, Kimble is called a "co-sponsor of Poe's Law", which is an adage about how a parody of an extreme view can be perceived as sincere when there is no obvious intent to satirize it. Kimble was a novelty candidate in the 2024 United States presidential election, running on the promotion of corn dogs over funnel cake. @RepJackKimble's tweets generally satirize the Republican Party.

== Notable activity ==
In 2010, a HuffPost article included a Kimble tweet on an article regarding the Fourteenth Amendment to the United States Constitution, with Kimble being assumed as a real congressman. Also in 2010, Kimble's account tweeted that the Iraq War and the War in Afghanistan were costless to taxpayers. Journalist Jonathan Capehart cited the account in an opinion piece for The Washington Post, believing Kimble to be a real congressman. That year, The Christian Science Monitor deemed the account a competitor for "best candidate-for-fun in the 2010 election landscape," and compared its tweets to the persona of Stephen Colbert on The Colbert Report. In 2013, Kimble tweeted about same-sex marriage laws, criticizing them by asking "what's to stop them from requiring us to be gay?" Political advisor Ben LaBolt retweeted it.

In 2019, Kimble tweeted a video of a young Alexandria Ocasio-Cortez, a New York congresswoman, dancing in a reenactment of a scene from The Breakfast Club. In June 2024, Kimble tweeted that the guilty verdict of the prosecution of Donald Trump in New York was "unfair". Prior to the 2024 United States vice presidential debate, Kimble tweeted that JD Vance "destroyed" Tim Walz in the debate. The tweet was posted about 12 hours before the debate began.

In January 2025, Kimble posted a tweet calling for Lake Ontario to be renamed to Lake America; president Donald Trump signed an executive order to implement the name change in August 2026. In 2025, Kimble tweeted saying he did not know the One Big Beautiful Bill Act to be about the budget. In a reply, he said "my bad" to someone telling him to read bills prior to voting. It satirized the fact that multiple Republican congress members did not read the full bill.

Also in 2025, a suggestion by Kimble to sell American beef to India rather than China spread across Chinese social media platforms. In May 2026, he tweeted in support of stock trading among members of Congress. He was heavily criticized by conservatives, including by Marcie Everhart, an "America First" candidate for Oklahoma's 4th district. The tweet received a Community Note clarifying he was fictional.

In July 2026, amid reports of Mitch McConnell's ongoing hospitalization following a medical emergency in June, Kimble posted a tweet claiming he had spoken with the senator for nearly 45 minutes. The post described McConnell as "sharp" and a "great listener" who "let me do all of the talking" followed by silent prayer and a staring contest that McConnell won. The tweet was mistakenly aired on CNN This Morning alongside statements from actual Republican politicians who claimed to have spoken to McConnell; the show apologised the following day. Also in July 2026, Kimble tweeted an AI-generated picture of a family, captioned "THIS IS THE AMERICA THEY WANT TO TAKE AWAY!!!".

== See also ==
- Jakob Maria Mierscheid – fictional German politician
