= Redskins Rule =

U.S. presidential election superstition

The Redskins Rule was an observed longstanding coincidence between the National Football League (NFL) game results of the Washington Redskins, now known as the Washington Commanders, and the results of subsequent United States presidential elections. Briefly stated, when Washington won its last home game prior to the presidential election, the party of the prior popular vote winning party won the presidency; when Washington lost, the opposition party won. This coincidence was noted by many sports and political commentators, and held true for the first eighteen elections after the franchise first moved to Washington in 1937. The rule was first broken in 2012, and then again in 2016 and 2024.

== History ==
The Washington Commanders, formerly known as the Washington Redskins, are an American football team belonging to the National Football League (NFL). The rule, named the Redskins Rule, stated that if they won their last home game before the election, the incumbent party would win and that if they lost, the challenging party would win. The rule was first noticed prior to the 2000 election by Steve Hirdt, executive vice president of the Elias Sports Bureau. That year, the Redskins would begin what would become a four-game losing streak with retrospect to the rule when they lost to the Tennessee Titans. George W. Bush defeated Al Gore in the Electoral College, but lost the popular vote. This would cause problems for the original version of the rule after the 2004 election.

In the 2004 election, the Redskins lost their last home game before the presidential election, indicating that the incumbent should have lost. However, President George W. Bush (the incumbent) went on to defeat John Kerry. Hirdt modified the rule by stating when the winner of the popular vote fails to win the election, the impact of the team's game on the subsequent election gets flipped.

This changed the rule to be based on the year’s electoral vote outcome and the prior popular vote outcome, as if Washington wins and the party that won the prior popular vote wins the year’s electoral vote, the rule would be upheld, as it would if both lost. In the election in 2000, Gore won the popular vote while Bush won the electoral vote, and thereby the revised Redskins Rule was upheld for the 2004 election. In the 2008 election, the Redskins lost to the Pittsburgh Steelers, predicting a win for U.S. Senator from Illinois Barack Obama over U.S. Senator from Arizona John McCain, because Bush won the popular vote in the previous election.

Prior to the 2012 election, the Redskins lost against the Carolina Panthers on November 4. The Redskins Rule predicted an outright loss for incumbent Barack Obama against challenger Mitt Romney, or that Obama would win the popular vote but lose via the Electoral College. However, Obama won the election with 332 electoral votes to Romney's 206, held the advantage in the popular vote by more than 4.7 million votes, and the Redskins Rule did not hold in 2012.

In 2016, the Redskins played their last designated home game prior to the election on October 16, defeating the Philadelphia Eagles 27–20. This outcome predicted a victory for Hillary Clinton of the Democratic Party, which was in power. Clinton's loss to Republican challenger Donald Trump in the election meant that the Redskins Rule did not hold in 2016 despite Clinton winning the popular vote.

Before the 2020 season, the Redskins retired their longtime name following the George Floyd protests, using the temporary name Washington Football Team for that season. They defeated the Dallas Cowboys 25–3 in their last home game prior to the election, which because of the rule being inverted due to the popular vote winner losing the previous election, predicted a victory for Joe Biden of the Democratic Party, which ended up correct.

The franchise adopted the name "Commanders" starting from the 2022 season. Their 2024 Hail Maryland victory against the Chicago Bears suggested a victory for Kamala Harris against Donald Trump in the 2024 election, although this was incorrect.

The rule typically does not count the team's time playing in Boston (1932–1936). The team competed as the Boston Braves in 1932 when they won 19–6 over the Staten Island Stapletons. This game does not conform to the rule, as Franklin D. Roosevelt defeated incumbent Herbert Hoover in that election. However, in 1936, the first election year the team competed under its longtime nickname, they defeated the Chicago Cardinals and the incumbent, Roosevelt, went on to win re-election.

== Results ==
Year	Electoral vote result	Game score	Popular vote winner	Incumbent popular vote	Rule upheld?
1932	Roosevelt defeats Hoover 472–59	19–6 win	Roosevelt	Lost electoral vote	No
1936	Roosevelt defeats Landon 523–8	13–10 win	Roosevelt	Won electoral vote	Yes
1940	Roosevelt defeats Willkie 449–82	37–10 win	Roosevelt	Won electoral vote	Yes
1944	Roosevelt defeats Dewey 432–99	14–10 win	Roosevelt	Won electoral vote	Yes
1948	Truman defeats Dewey & Thurmond 303–189–39	59–21 win	Truman	Won electoral vote	Yes
1952	Eisenhower defeats Stevenson 442–89	23–24 loss	Eisenhower	Lost electoral vote	Yes
1956	Eisenhower defeats Stevenson 457–73	20–9 win	Eisenhower	Won electoral vote	Yes
1960	Kennedy defeats Nixon 303–219	10–31 loss	Kennedy	Lost electoral vote	Yes
1964	Johnson defeats Goldwater 486–52	27–20 win	Johnson	Won electoral vote	Yes
1968	Nixon defeats Humphrey & Wallace 301–191–46	10–13 loss	Nixon	Lost electoral vote	Yes
1972	Nixon defeats McGovern 520–17	24–20 win	Nixon	Won electoral vote	Yes
1976	Carter defeats Ford 297–240	7–20 loss	Carter	Lost electoral vote	Yes
1980	Reagan defeats Carter 489–49	14–39 loss	Reagan	Lost electoral vote	Yes
1984	Reagan defeats Mondale 525–13	27–14 win	Reagan	Won electoral vote	Yes
1988	H. W. Bush defeats Dukakis 426–111	27–24 win	G. H. W. Bush	Won electoral vote	Yes
1992	B. Clinton defeats G. H. W. Bush 370–168	7–24 loss	B. Clinton	Lost electoral vote	Yes
1996	B. Clinton defeats Dole 379–159	31–16 win	B. Clinton	Won electoral vote	Yes
2000	G. W. Bush defeats Gore 271–266	21–27 loss	Gore	Lost electoral vote	Yes
2004	G. W. Bush defeats Kerry 286–251	14–28 loss	G. W. Bush	Lost electoral vote	Yes
2008	Obama defeats McCain 365–173	6–23 loss	Obama	Lost electoral vote	Yes
2012	Obama defeats Romney 332–206	13–21 loss	Obama	Won electoral vote	No
2016	Trump defeats H. Clinton 304–227	27–20 win	H. Clinton	Lost electoral vote	No
2020	Biden defeats Trump 306–232	25–3 win	Biden	Won electoral vote	Yes
2024	Trump defeats Harris 312–226	18–15 win	Trump	Lost electoral vote	No

== See also ==
- Curse of Tippecanoe
- Mierscheid law
