= Litre =

Unit of volume

litre
- One litre is equal to the volume of a cubic decimetre.

General information
- Unit system: Non-SI units mentioned in the SI Brochure
- Unit of: volume
- Symbol: L, l
- Named after: litron

Conversions
1 L in ...	... is equal to ...
- SI base unit: 10^{−3} m^{3}
- U.S. customary: ≈ 0.264 gallon

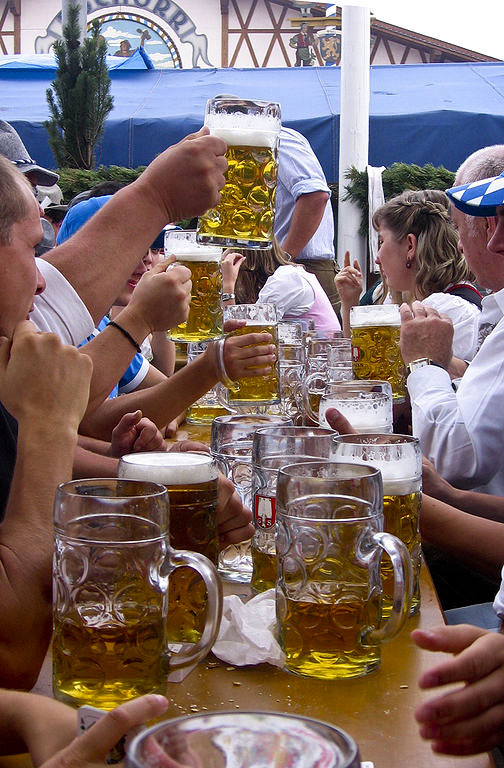
One-litre beer mugs (German: Maßkrüge) at the Oktoberfest in Germany

The litre (Commonwealth spelling) or liter (American spelling) (SI symbols L and l, other symbol used: ℓ) is a metric unit of volume. It is equal to 1 cubic decimetre (dm^{3}), 1000 cubic centimetres (cm^{3}) or 0.001 cubic metres (m^{3}). A cubic decimetre (or litre) occupies a volume of 10 cm × 10 cm × 10 cm (see figure) and is thus equal to one-thousandth of a cubic metre.

The original French metric system used the litre as a base unit. The word litre is derived from an older French unit, the litron, whose name came from Byzantine Greek—where it was a unit of weight, not volume—via Late Medieval Latin, and which equalled approximately 0.82 litres. The litre was also used in several subsequent versions of the metric system but is not an SI unit; the SI unit of volume is the cubic metre (m^{3}). The spelling used by the International Bureau of Weights and Measures is "litre", a spelling which is shared by most English-speaking countries. The spelling "liter" is predominantly used in American English. (Note: The Metric Conversion Act of 1985 gives the United States Secretary of Commerce the responsibility of interpreting or modifying the SI for use in the United States. The Secretary of Commerce delegated this authority to the Director of the National Institute of Standards and Technology (NIST) (Turner, 2008). In 2008, the NIST published the U.S. version (Taylor and Thompson, 2008a) of the English text of the eighth edition of the Bureau International des Poids et Mesures (BIPM) publication Le Système International d' Unités (SI) (BIPM, 2006). In the NIST publication, the spellings "meter", "liter" and "deka" are used rather than "metre", "litre" and "deca" as in the original BIPM English text (Taylor and Thompson, 2008a, p. iii). The Director of the NIST officially recognised this publication, together with Taylor and Thompson (2008b), as the "legal interpretation" of the SI for the United States (Turner, 2008).)

One litre of liquid water has a mass of almost exactly one kilogram, because the kilogram was originally defined in 1795 as the mass of one cubic decimetre of water at the temperature of melting ice (0 °C). Subsequent redefinitions of the metre and kilogram mean that this relationship is no longer exact.

== Definition ==
Some SI units of volume to scale and approximate corresponding mass of water

A litre is a cubic decimetre, which is the volume of a cube 10 centimetres × 10 centimetres × 10 centimetres (1 L ≡ 1 dm^{3} ≡ 1000 cm^{3}). Hence 1 L ≡ 0.001 m^{3} ≡ 1000 cm^{3}; and 1 m^{3} (i.e. a cubic metre, which is the SI unit for volume) is exactly 1000 L.

From 1901 to 1964, the litre was defined as the volume of one kilogram of pure water at maximum density (+3.98 °C) and standard pressure. The kilogram was in turn specified as the mass of the International Prototype of the Kilogram (a specific platinum/iridium cylinder) and was intended to be the same mass as the 1 litre of water referred to above. It was subsequently discovered that the cylinder was around 28 parts per million too large and thus, during this time, a litre was about 1.000028 dm^{3}. Additionally, the mass–volume relationship of water (as with any fluid) depends on temperature, pressure, purity and isotopic uniformity. In 1964, the definition relating the litre to mass was superseded. The litre is not an SI unit and is no longer described by the BIPM as accepted for use with the SI.

A litre is equal in volume to the millistere, an obsolete non-SI metric unit formerly customarily used for dry measure.

== Explanation ==
Litres are most commonly used for items (such as fluids and solids that can be poured) which are measured by the capacity or size of their container, whereas cubic metres (and derived units) are most commonly used for items measured either by their dimensions or their displacements. The litre is often also used in some calculated measurements, such as density (kg/L), allowing an easy comparison with the density of water.

One litre of water has a mass of almost exactly one kilogram when measured at its maximal density, which occurs at 3.984 °C. It follows, therefore, that 1/1000 of a litre, known as one millilitre (1 mL), of water has a mass of about 1 g, while 1000 litres of water has a mass of about 1000 kg (1 tonne or megagram).

This relationship holds because the gram was originally defined as the mass of 1 mL of water; however, this definition was abandoned in 1799 because the density of water changes with temperature and, very slightly, with pressure.

The density of water also depends on the isotopic ratios of the oxygen and hydrogen atoms in a particular sample. Modern measurements of Vienna Standard Mean Ocean Water, which is pure distilled water with an isotopic composition representative of the average of the world's oceans, show that it has a density of 0.999975±0.000001 kg/L at its point of maximum density (3.984 °C) under one standard atmosphere (101.325 kPa) of pressure.

== SI prefixes applied to the litre ==
The litre, though not an official SI unit, may be used with SI prefixes. The most commonly used derived unit is the millilitre, defined as one-thousandth of a litre, and also often referred to by the SI derived unit name "cubic centimetre". It is a commonly used measure, especially in medicine, cooking and automotive engineering. Other units may be found in the table below, where the more often used terms are in bold. However, some authorities advise against some of them; for example, in the United States, NIST advocates using the millilitre or litre instead of the centilitre. There are two international standard symbols for the litre: L and l. In the United States the former is preferred because of the risk that (in some fonts) the letter l and the digit 1 may be confused.

Multiple	Name	Symbols		Equivalent volume	
10^{−30} L	quectolitre	qL	ql	10^{3} pm^{3}	thousand cubic picometres
10^{−27} L	rontolitre	rL	rl	10^{6} pm^{3}	million cubic picometres
10^{−24} L	yoctolitre	yL	yl	nm^{3}	cubic nanometre
10^{−21} L	zeptolitre	zL	zl	10^{3} nm^{3}	thousand cubic nanometres
10^{−18} L	attolitre	aL	al	10^{6} nm^{3}	million cubic nanometres
10^{−15} L	femtolitre	fL	fl	μm^{3}	cubic micrometre
10^{−12} L	picolitre	pL	pl	10^{3} μm^{3}	thousand cubic micrometres
10^{−9} L	nanolitre	nL	nl	10^{6} μm^{3}	million cubic micrometres
10^{−6} L	**microlitre**	μL	μl	mm^{3}	cubic millimetre
10^{−3} L	**millilitre**	mL	ml	cm^{3}	cubic centimetre
10^{−2} L	**centilitre**	cL	cl	10^{1} cm^{3}	ten cubic centimetres
10^{−1} L	**decilitre**	dL	dl	10^{2} cm^{3}	hundred cubic centimetres
10^{0} L	**litre**	L	l	dm^{3}	cubic decimetre
10^{1} L	decalitre	daL	dal	10^{1} dm^{3}	ten cubic decimetres
10^{2} L	hectolitre	hL	hl	10^{2} dm^{3}	hundred cubic decimetres
10^{3} L	**kilolitre**	kL	kl	m^{3}	cubic metre
10^{6} L	**megalitre**	ML	Ml	dam^{3}	cubic decametre, 1 million litres
10^{9} L	**gigalitre**	GL	Gl	hm^{3}	cubic hectometre
10^{12} L	teralitre	TL	Tl	km^{3}	cubic kilometre
10^{15} L	petalitre	PL	Pl	10^{3} km^{3}	thousand cubic kilometres
10^{18} L	exalitre	EL	El	10^{6} km^{3}	million cubic kilometres
10^{21} L	zettalitre	ZL	Zl	Mm^{3}	cubic megametre
10^{24} L	yottalitre	YL	Yl	10^{3} Mm^{3}	thousand cubic megametres
10^{27} L	ronnalitre	RL	Rl	10^{6} Mm^{3}	million cubic megametres
10^{30} L	quettalitre	QL	Ql	Gm^{3}	cubic gigametre

== Non-metric conversions ==
Approx. value of 1 litre in non-metric units		Non-metric unit	Equivalent in litres
≈ 35.19507973	imperial fluid ounces	1 imperial fluid ounce	≡ 28.4130625 mL
≈ 33.8140227	US fluid ounces	1 US fluid ounce	≡ 29.5735295625 mL
≈ 7.03901595	imperial gills	1 imperial gill	≡ 142.0653125 mL
≈ 8.45350568	US gills	1 US gill	≡ 118.29411825 mL
≈ 1.75975399	imperial pints	1 imperial pint	≡ 568.26125 mL
≈ 2.11337642	US pints	1 US pint	≡ 473.176473 mL
≈ 0.87987699	imperial quart	1 imperial quart	≡ 1.1365225 L
≈ 1.05668821	US quarts	1 US quart	≡ 0.946352946 L
≈ 0.21996925	imperial gallon	1 imperial gallon	≡ 4.54609 L
≈ 0.26417205	US gallon	1 US gallon	≡ 3.785411784 L
≈ 0.03531467	cubic foot	1 cubic foot	≡ 28.316846592 L
≈ 61.02374409	cubic inches	1 cubic inch	≡ 16.387064 mL

See also Imperial units and US customary units.

=== Rough conversions ===
One litre is about 5.7% larger than a US liquid quart, and about 12% smaller than an imperial quart.

A mnemonic for its volume relative to an imperial pint is "a litre of water's a pint and three-quarters"; this is very close, as a litre is about 1.760 imperial pints.

A cubic foot has a volume of exactly 28.316846592 L.

== Symbol ==
Originally, the only symbol for the litre was l (lowercase letter L), following the SI convention that only those unit symbols that abbreviate the name of a person start with a capital letter. In many English-speaking countries, however, the most common shape of a handwritten Arabic digit 1 is just a vertical stroke; that is, it lacks the upstroke added in many other cultures. Therefore, the digit "1" may easily be confused with the letter "l". In some computer typefaces, the two characters are barely distinguishable. As a result, L (uppercase letter L) was adopted by the CGPM as an alternative symbol for litre in 1979. The United States National Institute of Standards and Technology recommends the use of the uppercase letter L, a practice that is also widely followed in Canada and Australia. In these countries, the symbol L is also used with prefixes, as in mL and μL, instead of the traditional ml and μl used in Europe. In the UK and Ireland, as well as the rest of Europe, lowercase l is used with prefixes, though whole litres are often written in full (so, "750 ml" on a wine bottle, but often "1 litre" on a juice carton). In 1990, the International Committee for Weights and Measures stated that it was too early to choose a single symbol for the litre.

=== Script l and Unicode ===
Prior to 1979, the symbol ℓ came into common use in some countries; for example, it was recommended by South African Bureau of Standards publication M33 and Canada in the 1970s. This symbol can still be encountered occasionally in some English-speaking and European countries, and its use is ubiquitous in Japan and South Korea.

Fonts covering the CJK characters usually include not only the script small ℓ but also four precomposed characters: ㎕, ㎖, ㎗, and ㎘ for the microlitre, millilitre, decilitre and kilolitre to allow correct rendering for vertically written scripts. These have Unicode equivalents for compatibility, which are not recommended for use with new documents:

- U+2113 ℓ SCRIPT SMALL L
- U+3395 ㎕ SQUARE MU L
- U+3396 ㎖ SQUARE ML
- U+3397 ㎗ SQUARE DL
- U+3398 ㎘ SQUARE KL

The CJK Compatibility block also includes U+3351 ㍑ SQUARE RITTORU corresponding to リットル rittoru, Japanese for 'litre'.

== History ==
The first name of the litre was "Cadil"; standards are shown at the Musée des Arts et Métiers in Paris.

The litre was introduced in France in 1795 as one of the new "republican units of measurement" and defined as one cubic decimetre. One litre of liquid water has a mass of almost exactly one kilogram, due to the gram being defined in 1795 as one cubic centimetre of water at the temperature of melting ice. The original decimetre length was 44.344 lignes, which was revised in 1798 to 44.3296 lignes. This made the original litre 1.000974 of today's cubic decimetre. It was against this litre that the kilogram was constructed.

In 1879, the CIPM adopted the definition of the litre, with the symbol l (lowercase letter L).

In 1901, at the 3rd CGPM conference, the litre was redefined as the space occupied by 1 kg of pure water at the temperature of its maximum density (3.98 °C) under a pressure of 1 atm. This made the litre equal to about 1.000028 dm^{3} (earlier reference works usually put it at 1.000027 dm^{3}).

In 1964, at the 12th CGPM conference, the original definition was reverted to, and thus the litre was once again defined in exact relation to the metre, as another name for the cubic decimetre, that is, exactly 1 dm^{3}.

In 1979, at the 16th CGPM conference, the alternative symbol L (uppercase letter L) was adopted. It also expressed a preference that in the future only one of these two symbols should be retained, but in 1990 said it was still too early to do so.

== Everyday usage ==
In spoken English, the symbol "mL" (for millilitre) can be pronounced as "mil". This can potentially cause confusion with some other measurement words such as:

1. "mm" for millimetre, a unit of length equal to one-thousandth of a metre
2. "mil" for thousandth of an inch
3. "mil", a Scandinavian unit of length equal to 10 kilometres
4. "mil", unit of angular measurement

The abbreviation "cc" (for cubic centimetre, equal to a millilitre or mL) is a unit of the cgs system, which preceded the MKS system, which later evolved into the SI system. The abbreviation "cc" is still commonly used in many fields, including medical dosage and sizing for combustion engine displacement.

The microlitre (μL) has been known in the past as the lambda (λ), but this usage is discouraged as of 2014. In the medical field the microlitre is sometimes abbreviated as mcL on test results.

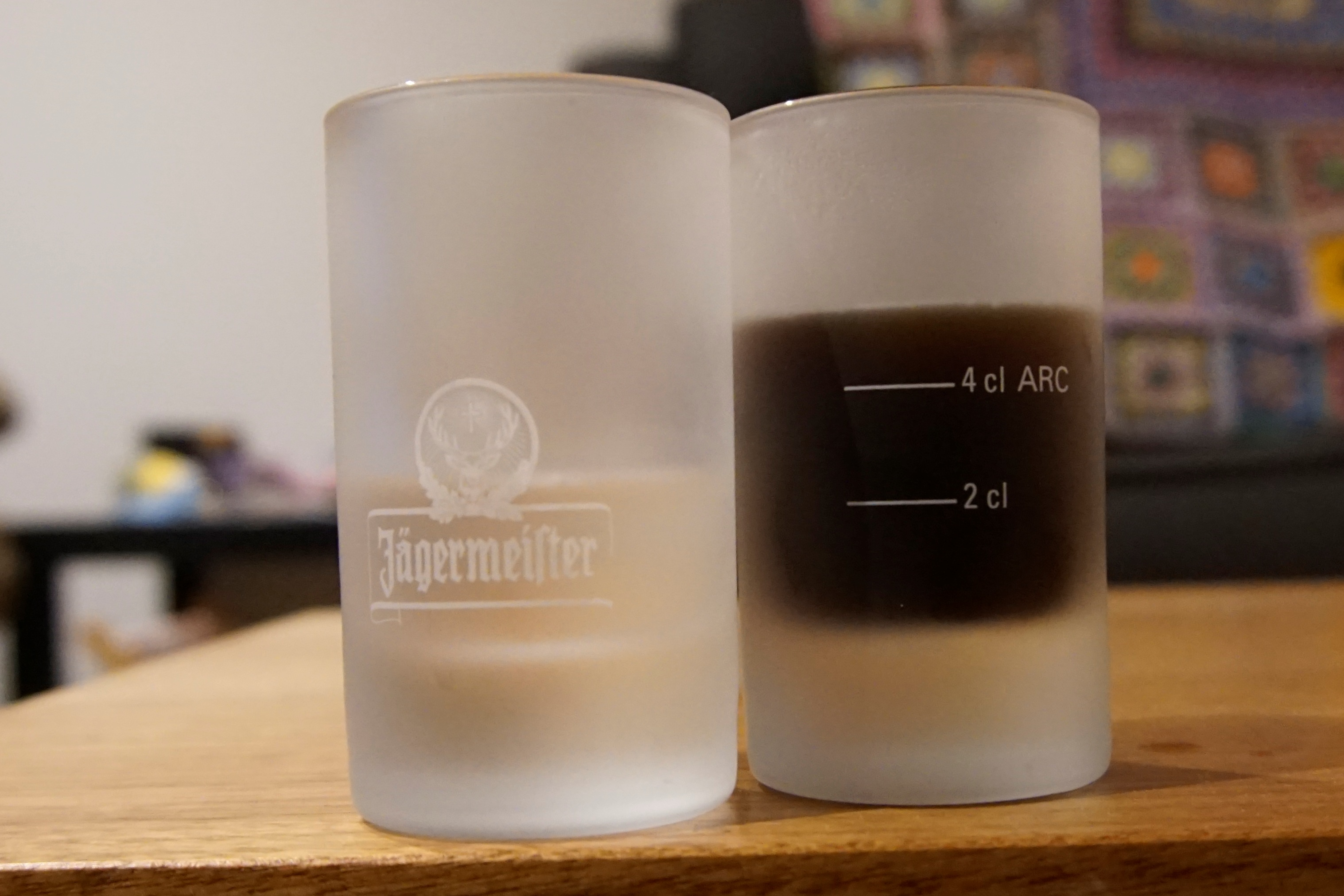
Shot glasses with centilitre fill line graduations. "ARC" is the maker's (Arc International) certification of accuracy.

In the SI system, apart from prefixes for powers of 1000, use of the "centi" (10^{−2}), "deci" (10^{−1}), "deca" (10^{+1}) and "hecto" (10^{+2}) prefixes with litres is common. For example, in many European countries, the hectolitre is the typical unit for production and export volumes of beverages (milk, beer, soft drinks, wine, etc.) and for measuring the size of the catch and quotas for fishing boats; decilitres are common in Croatia, Switzerland and Scandinavia and often found in cookbooks, and restaurant and café menus; centilitres indicate the capacity of drinking glasses and of small bottles. In colloquial Dutch in Belgium, a "vijfentwintiger" and a "drieëndertiger" (literally "twenty-fiver" and "thirty-threer") are the common beer glasses, the corresponding bottles mention 25 cL and 33 cL. Bottles may also be 75 cL or half size at 37.5 cL for "artisanal" brews or 70 cL for wines or spirits. Cans come in 25 cL, 33 cL and 50 cL. Similarly, alcohol shots are often marked in cL in restaurant menus, typically 3 cL (1.06 imp fl oz; 1.01 US fl oz).

Petrol units used in the world: Litre US gallon Imperial gallon No data

In countries where the metric system was adopted as the official measuring system after the SI standard was established, common usage eschews prefixes that are not powers of 1000. For example, in Canada, Australia, and New Zealand, consumer beverages are labelled almost exclusively using litres and millilitres. An exception is in pathology, where for instance blood lead level and blood sugar level may be measured in micrograms/milligrams per decilitre.

For larger volumes, kilolitres, megalitres, and gigalitres, have been used by the Northern Territory Government for measuring water consumption, reservoir capacities and river flows, although cubic metres are also used. Cubic metres are generally used for non-liquid commodities, such as sand and gravel, or storage space.

== See also ==
- Claude Émile Jean-Baptiste Litre – Fictional character
- Unit of volume

== Bibliography ==
- Bureau International des Poids et Mesures (2006). "The International System of Units (SI)" (PDF).
- Bureau International des Poids et Mesures. (2006). "The International System of Units (SI)" (on-line browser):
  - Table 6 (Non-SI units accepted for use with the International System). Retrieved 2008-08-24
- National Institute of Standards and Technology (11 November 2000). "Appendix C: General tables of units of measurement". NIST Handbook 44: Specifications, Tolerances, and Other Technical Requirements for Weighing and Measuring Devices. National Institute of Standards and Technology. Archived from the original on 10 December 2011.
- National Institute of Standards and Technology. (December 2003). The NIST Reference on Constants, Units, and Uncertainty: International System of Units (SI) (web site):
  - Note on SI units. Retrieved 2008-08-24.
  - Recommending uppercase letter L. Retrieved 2008-08-24.
- Taylor, B.N. and Thompson, A. (Eds.). (2008a). The International System of Units (SI). United States version of the English text of the eighth edition (2006) of the International Bureau of Weights and Measures publication Le Système International d' Unités (SI) (Special Publication 330). Gaithersburg, MD: National Institute of Standards and Technology. Retrieved 2008-08-18.
- Taylor, B.N. and Thompson, A. (2008b). Guide for the Use of the International System of Units (Special Publication 811). Gaithersburg, MD: National Institute of Standards and Technology. Retrieved 2008-08-23.
- Turner, J. (Deputy Director of the National Institute of Standards and Technology). (16 May 2008)."Interpretation of the International System of Units (the Metric System of Measurement) for the United States". Federal Register Vol. 73, No. 96, p. 28432-3.
- UK National Physical Laboratory. Non-SI Units
