= Sungods in Exile =

- First edition
- Author: David Gamon (as David Agamon, Karyl Robin-Evans)
- Language: English
- Genre: Journalistic hoax
- Published: 1978 (Neville Spearman)
- Publication place: United Kingdom
- Media type: Print (hardcover)
- Pages: 150
- ISBN: 9780854353149
- OCLC: 4990854

Sungods in Exile is a book by David Gamon that was published in 1978 under the pseudonym David Agamon, allegedly from the notes of a Karyl Robin-Evans who was said to be a professor at Oxford University.

The book tells of a 1947 expedition to Tibet in which the scientist visited the Bayan Har Mountains. Robin-Evans claimed that the Dropa tribe was of extraterrestrial origin and had crashed on Earth. The book featured photographs of the tribe and the alleged Dropa stones which contained messages from the extraterrestrials.

Although researchers were unable to locate Karyl Robin-Evans, the Dropa stones appeared regularly in the UFO subculture and author Hartwig Hausdorf popularized the story in his 1998 book The Chinese Roswell. Later variations of the story added a fictional Professor Tsum Um Nui of the equally fictional Beijing Academy for Ancient Studies who decoded the language of the stones.

In 1995, British author David Gamon admitted in Fortean Times that he had written Sungods in Exile as a hoax under the Agamon pseudonym, inspired by the popularity of Erich von Däniken and his books on ancient astronauts. The source material for the story was taken from a 1960s magazine article in Russian Digest, and a 1973 French science fiction novel Les disques de Biem-Kara, (The discs of Biem-Kara), by Daniel Piret.
