= Bayan Har Mountains =

Mountain range in Qinghai, China

Coordinates: 34°42′N 98°13′E

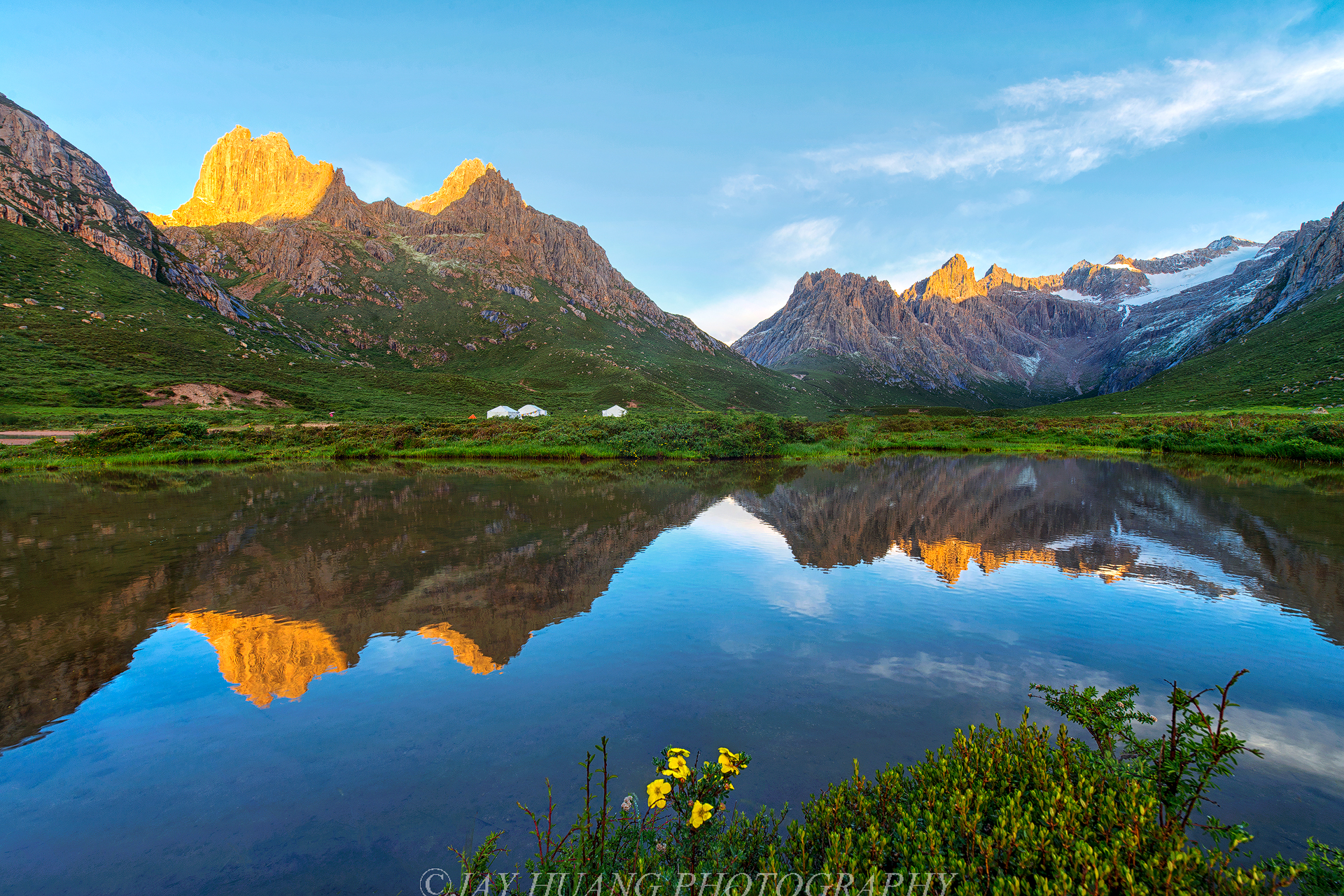
- Yaonü Lake, Nianbaoyuze Geopark, Jigzhi County, Golog Tibetan Autonomous Prefecture.

Geography
- Location: Qinghai, China

Bayan Har Mountains

Chinese name
- Traditional Chinese: 巴顏喀拉山脈
- Simplified Chinese: 巴颜喀拉山脉 (Note: Formerly also 巴颜喀喇山脉.)
Transcriptions
Standard Mandarin
- Hanyu Pinyin: Bāyánkālā Shānmài
- Wade–Giles: Pa-yan-k‘a-la Shan-mai
- IPA: [pá.jɛ̌n.kʰá.lá ʂán.mâɪ]

Tibetan name
- Tibetan: བ་ཡན་ཁ་ལ་རག་མོ

Mongolian name
- Mongolian Cyrillic: Баянхар уул
- Mongolian script: ᠪᠠᠶᠠᠨᠬᠠᠷ᠎ᠠ ᠠᠭᠤᠯᠠ

The Bayan Har Mountains, formerly known as the Bayen-káras or Bayan-Kara-Ula, are a mountain range in Qinghai Province, northwest China. The name is Mongolian for "Rich and Black". It can be viewed as one of the branches of the Kunlun Mountains. It separates the drainage areas of the Yellow and the Yangtze rivers. The source of the Yellow River is the Yueguzonglie Basin (Gyaring-Ngoring Lakes), which is located in the northern part of the range.

== In popular culture ==
The wizard Shang Ko in Barbara Hambly's fantasy Bride of the Rat God (1994) is described by his grandson as "the greatest of the mages of China, the last of the line of sorcerers of the Bayan Har Shan".

The Bayan Har mountain range is also mentioned in the first episode of the anime Ranma ½ (1989), based on the manga series by Rumiko Takahashi, when Ranma and his father take a trip through China in order to perfect their martial training. In the story, they are both cursed by the (fictional) magical springs of Jusenkyo, which sets up the main running gag of the series.
