= Kodee Kennings =

Fictional girl

Kodee Kennings is the name given to a fictitious 8-year-old girl, supposedly the daughter of a U.S. Army soldier named Dan Kennings in post-invasion Iraq. Kodee's plight was detailed in letters published in the Daily Egyptian, a student newspaper for Southern Illinois University in Carbondale, Illinois, beginning in 2003.

== Hoax ==
The story was concocted by Jaimie Reynolds, a woman who claimed to be Colleen Hastings, caregiver of the fictional Kodee. Reynolds allegedly passed a letter supposedly written by "Kodee," to Michael Brenner, who was then a sports editor at the Egyptian which prompted a feature story published May 6, 2003. In the article, "Kodee" told how upset she was by an anti-war protest at the university campus, and of her worries about her father "Dan" who was shipping off to Iraq with the 101st Airborne. Kodee's mother was said to be dead.

Over the next year, the Egyptian would publish, unedited, notes and letters from "Kodee", liberally strewn with misspellings and phonetic English, to update their readers about Dan's Iraq service or Kodee's daily life. A young friend of Reynolds, Caitlin Hadley, the daughter of a Nazarene minister, was recruited to play the part of Kodee for photographs, and a nurse, Patrick Trovillion, played Dan. Both believed that they were playing parts in a movie. "Kodee" was taken to the Egyptian newsroom and other Carbondale locations. "Dan" was photographed wearing camouflage, sitting on a tank, and meeting with school children in Michigan. "Dan" also called the newsroom and maintained an e-mail address at Yahoo! "Dan" was even portrayed as having been injured in a December 2004 explosion in a mess hall at a base near Mosul, Iraq. He reportedly returned to duty in a matter of weeks but was later injured again, this time by a roadside bomb while traveling via Humvee.

Reynolds also apparently penned a guest editorial published in the name of a real war widow, wherein the author claimed that her late husband had been a war buddy of Kennings'.

To further attempt to turn her hoax into reality, Jaimie Reynolds would dial the Daily Egyptian newsroom and – unbeknown to DE staff – allegedly disguise her voice to pretend to be the fictional girl "Kodee Kennings" wanting to talk to staff.

Throughout the hoax, Jaimie Reynolds also passed herself off as the twin sister of the fictional "Colleen Hastings" and visited the Daily Egyptian newsroom alternating as either Jaimie or "Colleen." Reynolds was a broadcast-journalism student at Southern Illinois University and graduated in 2004, putting her in classes alongside Daily Egyptian staff.

== Exposure ==
The hoax unraveled when Reynolds claimed in August 2005 that Kennings had died in Iraq. This news was published in the Egyptian, leading reporters from the Tribune to seek an interview with "Hastings." These reporters became suspicious when Reynolds routed interview requests through Brenner, who had become a close friend of hers.

Reynolds and Hadley (as "Hastings" and "Kodee"), along with members of the Egyptian staff, attended a memorial service arranged at the local American Legion outpost. After openly weeping at the service, Reynolds and Hadley met with Tribune reporters briefly at a restaurant, where they were told that media liaisons at The Pentagon were unable to confirm the existence of Kennings. Reynolds refused to provide any proof of Kennings' existence. Days later, reporters located her at her mother's home in Marion, Illinois, where she admitted to participating in the hoax.

Brenner was duped by Reynolds. After numerous articles in the Chicago Tribune, the Associated Press, the St. Louis Post-Dispatch and the Daily Egyptian itself, it appeared no crime was committed. The parents of Hadley were particularly upset, however and considered a restraining order against Reynolds.

Subsequent attempts to contact Reynolds after news of her hoax broke were unsuccessful. Reynolds went so far as to change the identity of her cell-phone voicemail from the fictional "Colleen Hastings" to "Blank Blank."

== Investigation ==
The Daily Egyptian subsequently investigated the hoax that had been perpetrated on its own paper. In part due to that investigation, the Egyptian won the Illinois College Press Association's General Excellence Award in 2006, as well as first place in the Investigative Reporting category.
