= Ngoring Lake =

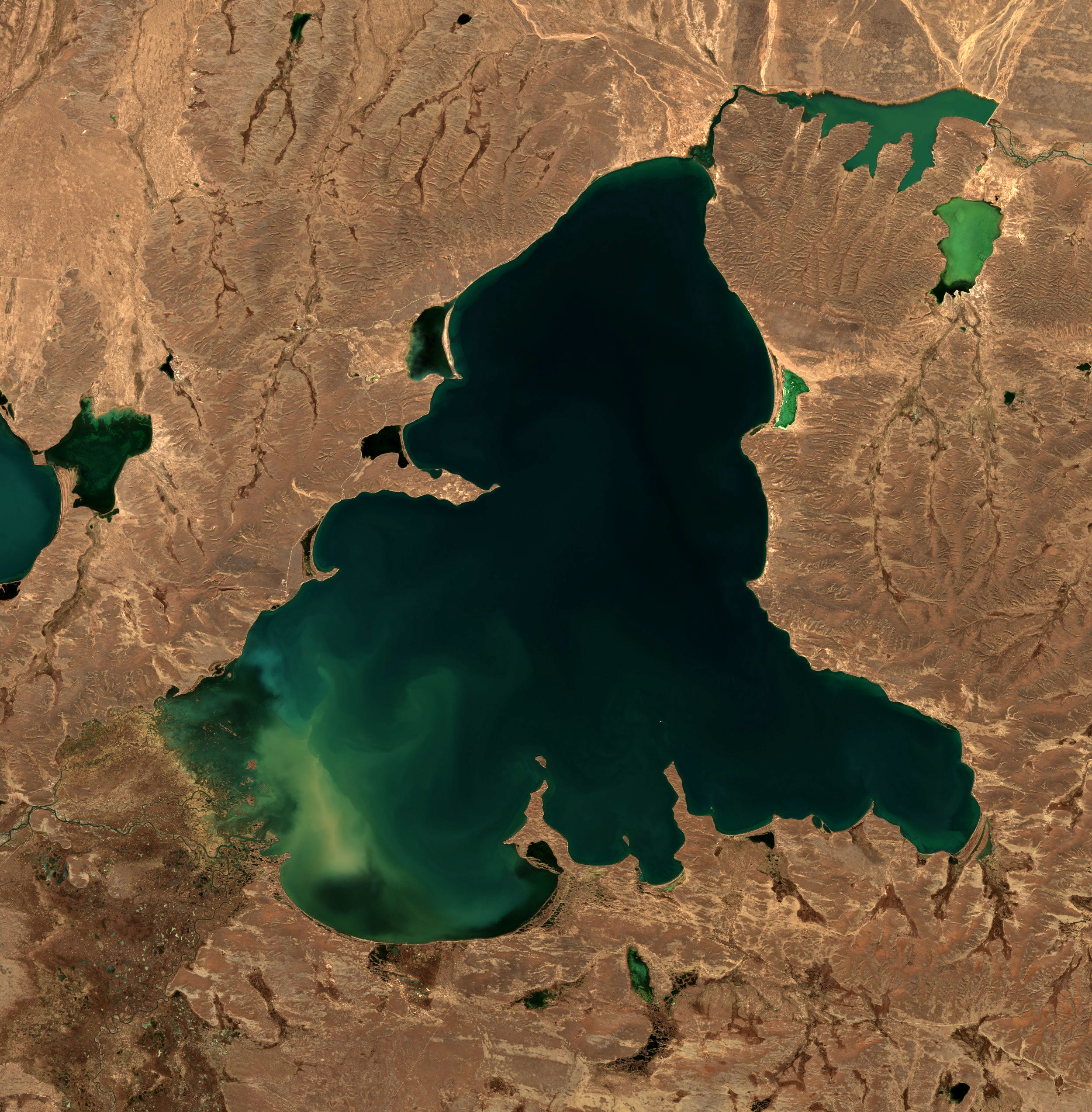

- Location within Qinghai
- Coordinates: 34°54′N 97°42′E
- Type: Fresh water lake
- Primary inflows: Yellow River, Lena Qu
- Primary outflows: Yellow River
- Catchment area: 18,188 km^{2} (7,022 sq mi)
- Basin countries: China
- Max. length: 32.3 km (20 mi)
- Max. width: 31.6 km (20 mi)
- Surface area: 610.7 km^{2} (200 sq mi)
- Average depth: 17.6 m (58 ft)
- Max. depth: 30.7 m (101 ft)
- Surface elevation: 4,268 m (14,003 ft)

Ramsar Wetland
- Official name: Eling Lake
- Designated: 7 December 2004
- Reference no.: 1436

Ngoring Lake (Tibetan: མཚོ་སྔོ་རིང་, Wylie: mtsho sngo ring) or Ngoreng Lake (Tibetan: མཚོ་སྔོ་རེངས, Wylie: mtsho sngo rengs) or Eling Lake (Chinese: 鄂陵湖; pinyin: èlíng Hú) is a large freshwater lake in the Yellow River catchment, in the southeast of Qinghai Province. The name of lake means "Long Blue Lake" in Tibetan language. Ngoring Lake is 610.7 km^{2} (235.8 sq mi), with a drainage area of 18,188 km^{2} (7,022 sq mi), an elevation of 4,268 m (14,003 ft), length 32.3 km (20.1 mi) and mean width 18.9 km (11.7 mi) (max 31.6 km (19.6 mi)). It is also the origin of the Yellow River.
