= Jakob Maria Mierscheid =

Fictitious politician in the German Bundestag

Jakob Maria Mierscheid (fictional) MdB
- Mierscheid as depicted in official sources

Member of the Bundestag for Rhineland-Palatinate
- Incumbent
- Assumed office 11 December 1979
- Preceded by: Carlo Schmid
- Constituency: Social Democratic Party List

Personal details
- Born: Jakob Maria Mierscheid; 1 March 1933 (age 93) Morbach, Rhineland-Palatinate, Nazi Germany (now Germany)
- Party: Social Democratic Party
- Occupation: Politician; tailor
- Website: Bundestag website

Jakob Maria Mierscheid MdB is a fictitious politician who has been in the German Bundestag since 11 December 1979. He was the alleged deputy chairman of the Mittelstandsausschuss (Committee for Small and Medium-Sized Businesses) of the Bundestag in 1981 and 1982. According to his official biography, he was born in Morbach/Hunsrück, a very rural constituency in Rhineland-Palatinate. He is Catholic and a member of the Social Democratic Party of Germany.

The idea of Jakob Mierscheid was created on 11 December 1979 on the back of a menu in the restaurant of the Bundestag, when two members of parliament from the SPD, Peter Würtz and Karl Haehser, decided that their recently deceased colleague Carlo Schmid needed a worthy successor. He is now a widely known curiosity within the Bundestag and uses Twitter as means of communication.

In 1983, the party magazine Vorwärts published an article purportedly written by Mierscheid claiming the discovery of a "law", the Mierscheid Law, that indicated a strong correlation between the election results of the SPD in national elections and West German steel production. The Bundestag official web site carries an ostensibly serious 'biography' and a photograph purporting to depict Mierscheid. In previous versions of the photograph, his fashion sense seemed very antiquated and his eyeglasses were added later. The current (2010) image shows a balding man sitting in a chair, facing away from the camera, in the middle of the empty Hall of Representatives. The German language version of the site lists 615 current names although the actual membership of the Bundestag is only 614, while the English and French language versions only list the actual membership of the Bundestag. Mierscheid has his own stationery and e-mail address and issues press releases now and then. (Note: which are in fact answered by one of the SPD MoPs) The picture of Mierscheid at the Bundestag is based on the RTL Samstag Nacht character Karl Ranseier. (Note: a fictitious person whose obituary appears in various forms as a running gag)

The hoax is paralleled in Germany in a number of other areas; for example, Friedrich Gottlob Nagelmann is a known (fictional) lawyer, and Edmund Friedemann Dräcker is a known (fictional) diplomat. Mierscheid, Nagelmann, and Dräcker each have a long list of publications which have sometimes really been published in otherwise reputable media (science journals, parliament press).

== Biography ==
The biography of Jakob Maria Mierscheid is that of a backbencher with a list of humble career steps. The official biography of the German parliament lists him as a member of the Trade Union of Peasants and Lumberjacks, member of the Sport Friends Club (treasurer 1977-1982), honorary member of the Choral Society of the Trade Union for Wood and Plastics Workers. First listed as official delegate to the Social Democrat Party congress in Hannover 1960, Mierscheid first visited the West German capital in 1967.

In 1967–68, he wrote a four-part series about the "travel routes of the ring-tailed wood pigeons and its avionics" in the Central Journal of the Carrier Pigeon Breeder Association, reprinted 1969 in the Swiss-confederate journal "Homing Pigeon Correspondences". He entered the parliament in 1979. Following his time as deputy chairman of the Mittelstandsausschuss (Committee for Small and Medium-Sized Businesses) of the Bundestag in 1981 and 1982, he wrote an article on the "Mierscheid Law" in the Social Democrats' journal Vorwärts (Note: Vorwärts, literally "Forward", from 19th-century revolutionary slogan "Forward") published on 14 July 1983.

His activities continued with an article in Vorwärts titled "The Solution: More market than corruption" published on 12 January 1985, and in 1993 he authored "Ecological data on the CFC replacement R134a" for the third Höchst Stone Louse Symposium in Frankfurt. (Note: (The stone louse is a fictitious species described in the highly reputed medical dictionary, Pschyrembel).)

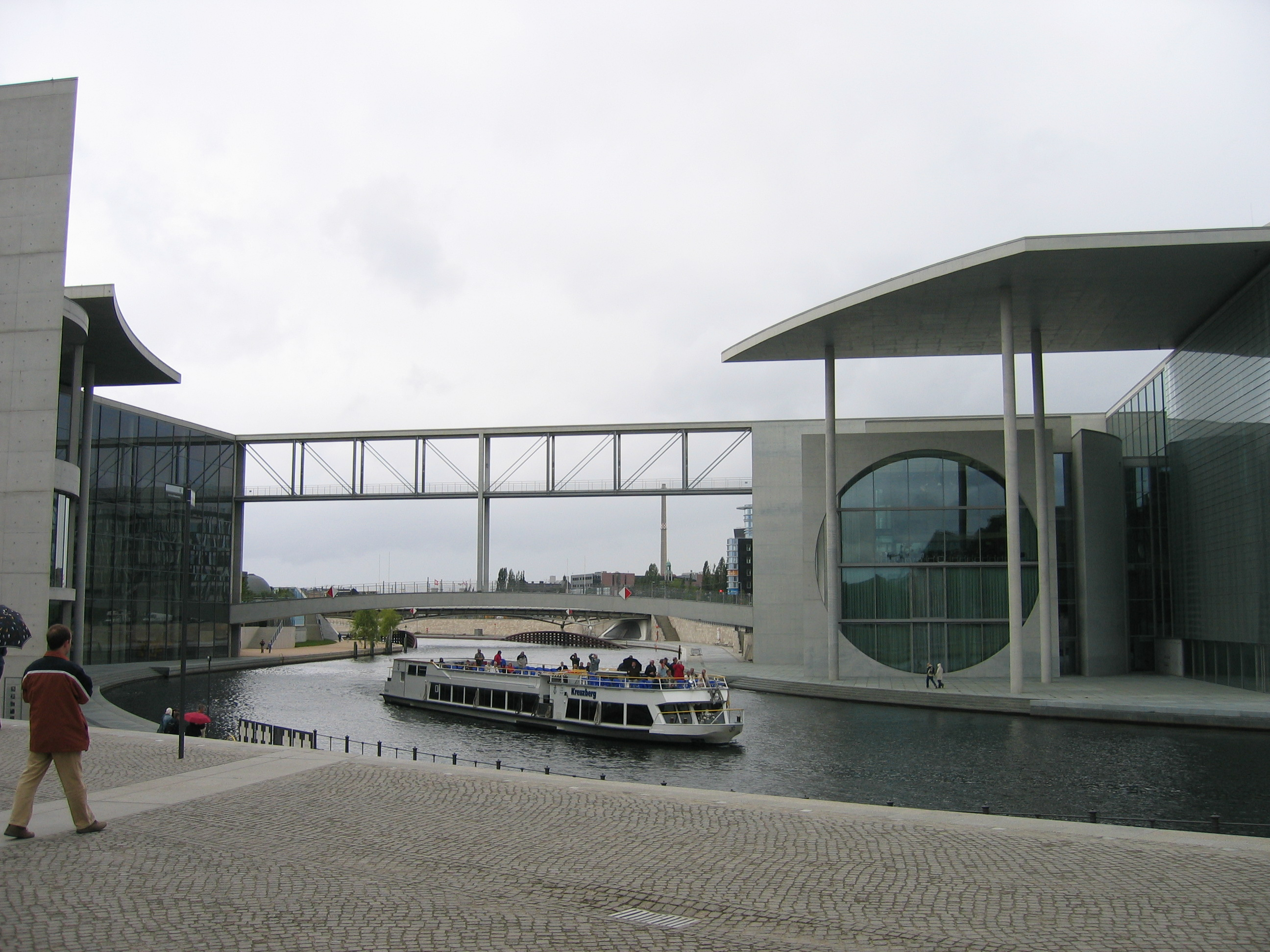
Mierscheid Bridge

There are some approved biography books like that of Peter Raabe: Die Mierscheid-Akte. Dokumentarische Spuren eines Phantoms (The Mierscheid File: Documentary Traces of a Phantom). Later Dietrich Sperling and Friedhelm Wollner published Jakob Mierscheid, Aus dem Leben eines Abgeordneten: Eine politische Holografie (Jakob Mierscheid, from the Life of a Member of Parliament: A Political Holography) in 1998.

On 11 December 2004, Mierscheid celebrated his 25th anniversary as member of the Bundestag. On 1 March 2013, the President of the German Bundestag, Mr. Norbert Lammert, said an official congratulation on occasion of Mierscheid's 80th birthday. Mierscheid did not show up to a reception given in his honour in his home-town of Morbach.

In July 2005, the German Tagesschau announced the exit of Mierscheid from SPD to the German Linkspartei and WASG. Mierscheid's angry dementi was announced both by the Tagesschau, and an interview in Der Spiegel.

After the parliament moved to Berlin, two new office buildings for members of parliament were connected with a pedestrian bridge over the Spree river. This bridge was nicknamed the "Mierscheid Bridge". Attempts to mark it with an official plate were said to have failed because "the nails were nuts" (pun on Niete meaning nut/rivet, a blank in lottery or a person that is unable to accomplish anything).

After the historic defeat in the 2009 election, Mierscheid quoted Alfred, Lord Tennyson's poem "Ulysses" in German to raise the spirits of his comrades in the Bundestag.

Tho' much is taken, much abides; and tho'
We are not now that strength which in old days
Moved earth and heaven; that which we are, we are;
One equal temper of heroic hearts,
Made weak by time and fate, but strong in will
To strive, to seek, to find, and not to yield.

== Further appreciation ==
On Mierscheid’s 80th "birthday" in 2013, his alleged home town Morbach opened a hiking trail, a roundtrip of about 16 km (10 miles), providing humorous reflections on Mierscheid’s life and political activities on 14 information boards along the trail.

== See also ==
- List of fictitious people
- George P. Burdell, fictional student of the Engineering Department at Georgia Tech
- Jack Kimble, a fictional American congressman
