= Blanche Descartes =

British mathematicians' collective pseudonym

Blanche Descartes was a collaborative pseudonym used by the English mathematicians R. Leonard Brooks, Arthur Harold Stone, Cedric Smith, and W. T. Tutte. The four mathematicians met in 1935 as undergraduate students at Trinity College, Cambridge, where they joined the Trinity Mathematical Society and began meeting together to work on mathematical problems.

== Pseudonym ==
The pseudonym originated by combining the initials of the mathematicians' given names (Bill, Leonard, Arthur, and Cedric) to form BLAC. This was extended to BLAnChe. The surname Descartes was chosen as a play on the common phrase carte blanche.

== Publication ==
Over 30 works were published under the name, including whimsical poetry and mathematical humour, but some serious mathematical results as well. Many of these publications appeared in Eureka, a mathematical student magazine in Cambridge. Notably, the foursome proved several theorems in mathematical tessellation. In particular, they solved the problem of squaring the square, showing that a square can be divided into smaller squares, no two of which are the same. They also discovered "Blanche's Dissection", a method of dividing a square into rectangles of equal area but different dimensions. They modelled these using abstract electrical networks, an approach that yielded not only solutions to the original problem, but techniques with wider applications to the field of electrical networks. They published their results—under their own names—in 1940. Tutte, who is believed to have contributed the most work under Descartes's name, kept up the pretence for years, refusing to acknowledge even in private that she was fictitious.

"Descartes" also published on graph colouring, and Tutte used the pseudonym to publish the fourth known snark, now called the Descartes snark. She also published the poem "Hymne to Hymen" as a gift to Hector Pétard (another fictitious mathematical personage) on the day of his wedding to Betti Bourbaki (daughter of Nicolas Bourbaki, yet another fictitious mathematical personage).

=== Selected publications ===
- Descartes, Blanche (October 1964). "Why are Series Musical?". Eureka. 27: 29–31. Archived from the original on 2010-04-01.
- Descartes, Blanche (May 1977). "Review of Bondy & Murty's Graph theory with applications" (PDF). Bulletin of the American Mathematical Society. 83 (3): 313–315. doi:10.1090/S0002-9904-1977-14245-6.
- Ungar, Peter; Descartes, Blanche; Advanced Problems and Solutions: Solutions: 4526. Amer. Math. Monthly 61 (1954), no. 5, 352–353.

== See also ==
- Nicolas Bourbaki
- Arthur Besse
- John Rainwater
- G. W. Peck
- Monsieur LeBlanc
