= Arthur Besse =

Pseudonym used by a group of French differential geometers

Arthur Besse is a pseudonym chosen by a group of French differential geometers, led by Marcel Berger, following the model of Nicolas Bourbaki. A number of monographs have appeared under the name.

== Bibliography ==
- Besse, Arthur L. (1987). Einstein Manifolds. Berlin: Springer. ISBN 978-3-540-15279-8.
  - Besse, Arthur L. (2008). Einstein Manifolds. Classics in Mathematics. Berlin: Springer. ISBN 978-3-540-74120-6.
- Actes de la Table Ronde de Géométrie Différentielle. [Proceedings of the Roundtable on Differential Geometry] En l'honneur de Marcel Berger. [In honor of Marcel Berger] Held in Luminy, July 12–18, 1992. Edited by Arthur L. Besse. Séminaires et Congrès [Seminars and Congresses], 1. Société Mathématique de France, Paris; distributed by American Mathematical Society, Providence, RI, 1996.
- Besse, Arthur L.: Some trends in Riemannian geometry. Duration and change, 71–105, Springer, Berlin, 1994 doi:10.1007/978-3-642-78502-3_22.
- Besse, A. Многообразия Эйнштейна. Том I, II. (Russian) [Einstein manifolds. Vol. I, II] Translated from the English and with a preface by D. V. Alekseevskiĭ. "Mir", Moscow, 1990. Vol. I: 320 pp.; Vol. II: pp. 321–704.
- Besse, Arthur L.: Einstein manifolds. Ergebnisse der Mathematik und ihrer Grenzgebiete (3) [Results in Mathematics and Related Areas (3)], 10. Springer-Verlag, Berlin, 1987 doi:10.1007/978-3-540-74311-8.
- Четырехмерная риманова геометрия. (Russian) [Riemannian geometry in dimension 4] Семинар Артура Бессе 1978/79. [The Arthur Besse seminar 1978/79] Translated from the French by G. B. Shabat. Translation edited by A. N. Tyurin. "Mir", Moscow, 1985.
- Géométrie riemannienne en dimension 4. (French) [Riemannian geometry in dimension 4] Papers from the Arthur Besse seminar held at the Université de Paris VII, Paris, 1978/1979. Edited by Lionel Bérard-Bergery, Marcel Berger and Christian Houzel. Textes Mathématiques [Mathematical Texts], 3. CEDIC, Paris, 1981.
- Besse, Arthur L. Многообразия с замкнутыми геодезическими. (Russian) [Manifolds all of whose geodesics are closed] Translated from the English by Yu. S. Osipov, I. D. Novikov and Yu. P. Solovʹev. Edited and with a preface by Vladimir Mikhaĭlovich Alekseev. "Mir", Moscow, 1981.
- Besse, Arthur L. Manifolds all of whose geodesics are closed. With appendices by D. B. A. Epstein, J.-P. Bourguignon, L. Bérard-Bergery, M. Berger and J. L. Kazdan. Ergebnisse der Mathematik und ihrer Grenzgebiete [Results in Mathematics and Related Areas], 93. Springer-Verlag, Berlin-New York, 1978, doi:10.1007/978-3-642-61876-5.

== See also ==
- Nicolas Bourbaki
- John Rainwater
- Blanche Descartes
- G. W. Peck
- Monsieur LeBlanc
