= H. Rochester Sneath =

Fictional British headmaster

H. Rochester Sneath MA L-ès-L (c. 1900 – ?) is a fictional character, headmaster of the fictional Selhurst school, who was created by Humphry Berkeley in a series of hoax letters to public school headmasters and public figures starting in 1948.

== Fictional biography ==
Sneath was supposedly the headmaster of Selhurst School ("near Petworth, Sussex"), a preparatory school with 175 male students.

== Invention of Sneath ==
Selhurst School and Rochester Sneath were the inventions of Humphry Berkeley, then an undergraduate student at Pembroke College, Cambridge.

Berkeley ordered headed notepaper printed with Selhurst's letterhead. He arranged with the Royal Mail to have his post forwarded to his Cambridge address. After some time they refused to send mail from a nonexistent address, so he would ask his correspondents to reply c/o Mrs Harvey-Kelly, at a Cambridge address which was that of a fellow student.

== The letters ==
=== Headmasters ===
Berkley's earliest letters as Sneath, written in March 1948, were to the headmasters of several British public schools.

The Master of Marlborough College, F. M. Heywood, was livid when Sneath asked how he had "engineered" a recent visit of the royal family. Next, he received a letter in which Sneath warned that he should not hire a French teacher, 'Robert Agincourt', because he had climbed a tree naked. Finally, when asked to recommend a private detective and a competent nursery maid, Heywood wrote back, "I am not an agency for domestic servants. I really must ask you not to bother me with this kind of thing."

Other letters written by Sneath included:

- A letter to the headmaster of Stowe School to ask if he should provide sex education for the school maids.
- A complaint to the headmaster of Oundle School that the school chaplain was hopeless as a rat catcher.
- Asking Haileybury for a reference for a teacher who had a club foot and warts.
- Even the headmaster of Eton received a letter from Sneath, asking to apply for his job.

Some of the headmasters answered politely to a person they thought to be a fellow headmaster; one even recommended Selhurst to a parent of a prospective pupil.

=== Public figures ===
Public figures soon found themselves receiving letters too:

- George Bernard Shaw received an invitation to speak at an annual celebration at Selhurst; he declined.
- Architect Sir Giles Gilbert Scott was informed of the possibility of designing a new main building for the school; he declined as well.
- Conductor Sir Adrian Boult was invited to conduct the school orchestra; he, like Shaw and Scott, was not enthusiastic.

Two of Sneath's correspondents detected the hoax: one was Walter Oakeshott of Winchester College, who declined an invitation because he was attending a commemoration of a remote ancestor at Salt Lake City, Utah. The other was John Sinnott, rector of Beaumont College. When invited to lead an exorcism, Sinnott requested a packet of salt "capable of being taken up in pinches" be ready for him.

== Exposure ==
On 13 April 1948, Sneath's letter was published in the Daily Worker, complaining of the difficulty in importing Russian textbooks for compulsory Russian lessons in his school.

The News Review asked to interview Sneath to discover more about this unusual school, but Sneath's "secretary", "Penelope Pox-Rhyddene", claimed he was ill. The journalist then visited Petworth to discover that there was no Selhurst School there, and subsequently turned up on the doorstep of Berkeley's friend's lodgings.

A story in the News Review on 29 April revealed that Berkeley was behind the hoax.

Berkeley was sent down (excluded from university) for two years.

== After Sneath, and publication ==
Berkeley was later elected Conservative Member of Parliament for Lancaster in the 1959 general election.

The Rochester Sneath letters were published in 1974 under the title The Life and Death of Rochester Sneath, together with drawings by Nicolas Bentley.

== Books ==
- Berkeley, Humphry (1974). The Life and Death of Rochester Sneath. London: Davis-Poynter. ISBN 0-7067-0150-X.
