= Mierscheid law =

Hypothesis based on a spurious relationship

The Mierscheid law is a satirical forecast hypothesis based on a spurious relationship, published in the German magazine Vorwärts on 14 July 1983 and attributed to the fictitious politician Jakob Maria Mierscheid. It forecasts the Social Democratic Party of Germany (SPD)'s share of the popular vote based on the size of crude steel production in the old states that used to make up West Germany:

The Vote share of the SPD equals the Index of the crude steel production in the western federal states – measured in millions of tonnes – in the year of the federal election.

There is a special rule for early elections. One then has to take the arithmetic mean of the regular and early year of election.

The last corroboration of the law was in the 2002 election, where the West German crude steel production was 38.6 million tonnes, and the vote share of the SPD 38.5%. For the early election in 2005 the vote share was 38.4%, with a mean crude steel value of 40.0 million tonnes. Over the last ten elections, the two values were within two units nine times, and within one unit seven times.

== Possible refutation of the hypothesis in 2005 ==
In the German federal elections of 18 September 2005 (which were originally due to be held in 2006), the law appeared not to hold, since the SPD obtained 34.3% of the relevant votes while the crude steel production of the "old" Länder (i.e. those states that belonged to the Federal Republic of Germany before reunification) in the previous year was 39.9 million tonnes.

However, an article attributed to Jakob Mierscheid, published on the German Federal Parliament's website provided a correction to the hypothesis, to take account of the special situation. Since the elections had been brought forward, it was argued that the last months of the year should be discounted, yielding a steel production figure of 33.5 million tonnes. The graph included in the article showed a good match, thus supporting the (corrected) hypothesis. This ad hoc hypothesis alteration might be considered an example of the Texas sharpshooter fallacy.

Following the 2005 elections, an article was published by the statistical office of the state of Baden-Württemberg attempting to further refine the model in the form of the Mierscheid-Walla law. This article also mentions promising but inconclusive attempts to replace steel production with other measures that exhibited a degree of apparent correlation, such as the export value of automobiles, employment levels in the field of legal advice, the price of coffee, and the number of accidents on town roads.

== See also ==
- Correlation does not imply causation
- Correlation
- Redskins Rule
