= John Rainwater =

Fictitious American mathematician

- Known for: Rainwater's theorem, Rainwater seminar (functional analysis)

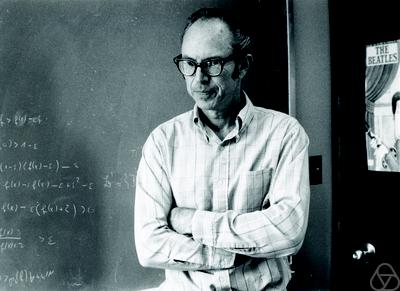
Functional analyst Robert Phelps (pictured) wrote the first biography of John Rainwater.

The fictitious mathematician John Rainwater was created as a student prank but has become known as the author of important results in functional analysis.

At the University of Washington in 1952, John Rainwater was invented and enrolled in a mathematics course by graduate students who were in possession of a duplicate student-registration form. Later, mathematicians published under the pseudonym of John Rainwater.

Papers were published under the name Rainwater mainly in functional analysis, particularly in the geometric theory of Banach spaces and in convex functions. Rainwater's theorem is an important result in summability theory and functional analysis. The University of Washington's seminar in functional analysis is called the Rainwater seminar, and the associated Rainwater notes have influenced Banach-space theory and convex analysis.

The concept of a fictional pseudonym used by multiple people creating valuable mathematics is not unique. Most notably, Nicolas Bourbaki has been the collective pseudonym for a number of leading mathematicians writing in French for many decades.

== Creation ==
John Rainwater was invented by graduate students at the University of Washington in 1952, when students used an extra registration form to enroll Rainwater in a course on real functions. Students submitted homework for Rainwater throughout the semester. The professor caught on to the prank around the middle of the term. Other students in the class were made aware of the situation from the professor's enigmatic remarks after he became the victim of a novelty "exploding" fountain pen bearing Rainwater's name.

== Research ==
Early on, Rainwater distinguished himself by solving problems in the American Mathematical Monthly, whose sponsoring society, the Mathematical Association of America, invited him to join. John R. Isbell published the first paper in Rainwater's name. Other mathematicians have published papers using the name "Rainwater", and acknowledged "Rainwater's assistance" in articles. The seminar on functional analysis at the University of Washington has been called the "Rainwater seminar". Rainwater's theorem is an important result in summability theory and Banach-space theory.

=== Evaluation ===
In 2002 Robert Phelps summarized the impact of Rainwater's research. The first Rainwater paper (by Isbell) was in topology and had had 19 citations. While only one page, Rainwater's note in the 1963 Proceedings of the American Mathematical Society had had eight citations in papers; its main result has been called "Rainwater's theorem" in books on convex functions and functional analysis. "There is even one citation to number 13, his unpublished 1967 Rainwater Seminar note on Lindenstrauss spaces," which are named after a construction by Joram Lindenstrauss. "In summary, it appears that most of John Rainwater's published work has been reasonably well received." While Rainwater is lesser known and younger than Nicolas Bourbaki, the collective pseudonym for a number of leading mathematicians writing in French, he is more senior and has more publications than the combination of research by three other pseudonymous mathematicians—Peter Orno, M. G. Stanley, and H. C. Enos.

== Mathematicians publishing as Rainwater ==
Many internationally renowned mathematicians have published under the name of John Rainwater. John Isbell wrote Rainwater's first, second, and tenth papers; by 2002, Isbell had also written or coauthored six other pseudonymous papers under two other names. Functional analyst Robert R. Phelps wrote the third, ninth, eleventh (an unpublished note for the Rainwater seminar), twelfth, and thirteenth (with Peter D. Morris), fifteenth (with Isaac Namioka), and sixteenth (with David Preiss) papers. Irving Glicksberg wrote the fourth and eighth papers. Edgar Asplund wrote the seventh. "Paper 14 is a departure for John Rainwater. Not only is it in algebra, but he doesn't thank anyone for helpful conversations. He notes, however, that his work was supported by four different grants. (Culprits this time were Ken A. Brown, Ken Goodearl, Toby Stafford and Bob Warfield.)" John Rainwater's c.v. lists an incomplete collection of problems or solutions that he contributed to the American Mathematical Monthly, the earliest in 1959 (by John Isbell).

== See also ==
- Monsieur LeBlanc (pseudonym of Sophie Germain)

Collaborative pseudonyms:

- Nicolas Bourbaki
- Arthur Besse
- Blanche Descartes
- G. W. Peck
