= Humphry Berkeley =

British politician and author (1926–1994)

Member of Parliament for Lancaster
- In office 8 October 1959 – 10 March 1966
- Preceded by: Fitzroy Maclean
- Succeeded by: Stanley Henig

Personal details
- Born: Humphry John Berkeley; 21 February 1926 Marlow, Buckinghamshire, England
- Died: 14 November 1994 (aged 68)
- Party: Conservative (1948–70); Labour (1970–81; 1988–94); SDP (1981–88)
- Education: Pembroke College, Cambridge

Humphry John Berkeley (21 February 1926 – 14 November 1994) was a British politician and author. He was noted for his three changes of parties and his early support for gay rights.

He is also remembered for a series of hoax letters he sent as fictional headmaster "H. Rochester Sneath" while an undergraduate, and later published as The Life and Death of Rochester Sneath.

== Background and early life ==
He was born on 21 February 1926, at Marlow, Buckinghamshire. Berkeley's father, Reginald, was Liberal Member of Parliament (MP) for Nottingham Central from 1922 to 1924 and a noted playwright. Humphry Berkeley attended Malvern College followed by Pembroke College, Cambridge, and was President of both the Cambridge Union Society and Cambridge University Conservative Association in 1948.

== H. Rochester Sneath ==
Berkeley's studies were interrupted when he was excluded ("sent down") for two years as a result of a practical joke in which he impersonated "H. Rochester Sneath", the fictional headmaster of a rather odd public school, and wrote hoax letters to public figures.

Berkeley knew Rab Butler, who arranged a job for him at Conservative Central Office during this time; Butler also advised him to keep the hoax letters and their replies safe, and publish them a quarter of a century later. The "Rochester Sneath letters" were duly published in 1974.

== Career ==
Berkeley established his own public relations company and became head of publicity and public relations for a group of civil engineering companies. As a strong supporter of European union, he was Director-General of the United Kingdom Council of the European Movement in 1956–1957. In the 1959 general election he was elected as a Conservative MP for Lancaster.

Berkeley was a strong internationalist who supported the work of the United Nations; his father had supported the League of Nations. He served on the Parliamentary Assembly of the Western European Union and the Council of Europe from 1963. On the socially liberal wing of his party, Berkeley was a member of the Howard League for Penal Reform and from 1965 the honorary Treasurer. That year he also drew up the new rules for election of the Leader of the Conservative Party.

When he won second place in the ballot for Private Member's Bills in 1965, Berkeley decided to introduce a bill to legalise male homosexual relations along the lines of the Wolfenden report. Indeed, according to a 2007 article published in The Observer, Berkeley was well known to his colleagues as a homosexual, and not much liked. His Bill was given a second reading by 164 to 107 on 11 February 1966, but fell when Parliament was dissolved soon after. Unexpectedly, Berkeley lost his seat in the 1966 general election, and ascribed his defeat to the unpopularity of his bill on homosexuality.

Out of Parliament, Berkeley took a job as chairman of the United Nations Association. In this capacity he employed Jeffrey Archer, who was establishing a reputation for raising large amounts of money for charities, to organise the UNA's flag day collection. Despite barely increasing the previous year's total, Archer was promoted to organise a dinner at 10 Downing Street, which raised more than £200,000. According to the journalist Alan Watkins, Berkeley would later accuse Archer of having made false expenses claims while he worked for the UNA, and reported him to Anthony Barber, then Chairman of the Conservative Party, when Archer sought to become an MP (although this did not prevent Berkeley from collaborating with Archer to write a book, Faces of the Eighties, many years later).

In 1968, he had resigned from the Conservative Party, largely in opposition to its stance on the Vietnam War, although he subsequently rejoined for a very short period. In 1970, he joined the Labour Party and stood unsuccessfully as a Labour candidate for Fylde North in October 1974.

He then spent time apparently working as a roving ambassador of the now defunct Republic of Transkei, a bantustan, until he was abducted one night in February 1979 while dining at the Umtata Holiday Inn, and assaulted on the side of a road, put into the boot of a car, and dumped over the border at Kei Bridge.

As a moderate and pro-European, Berkeley joined the SDP in 1981, and fought Southend East for them in 1987. In 1988, with the SDP splitting over whether to merge with the Liberals, he rejoined Labour.

Parliament of the United Kingdom
Preceded by Fitzroy Maclean	Member of Parliament for Lancaster; 1959–1966	Succeeded by Stanley Henig
