= G. W. Peck =

Pseudonym for a group of mathematicians

G. W. Peck is a pseudonymous attribution used as the author or co-author of a number of published academic papers in mathematics. Peck is sometimes humorously identified with George Wilbur Peck, a former governor of the US state of Wisconsin.

Peck first appeared as the official author of a 1979 paper entitled "Maximum antichains of rectangular arrays". The name "G. W. Peck" is derived from the initials of the actual writers of this paper: Ronald Graham, Douglas West, George B. Purdy, Paul Erdős, Fan Chung, and Daniel Kleitman. The paper initially listed Peck's affiliation as Xanadu, but the editor of the journal objected, so Ron Graham gave him a job at Bell Labs. Since then, Peck's name has appeared on some sixteen publications, primarily as a pseudonym of Daniel Kleitman.

In reference to "G. W. Peck", Richard P. Stanley defined a Peck poset to be a graded partially ordered set that is rank symmetric, rank unimodal, and strongly Sperner. The posets in the original paper by G. W. Peck are not quite Peck posets, as they lack the property of being rank symmetric.

== See also ==
- Nicolas Bourbaki
- Arthur Besse
- John Rainwater
- Blanche Descartes
- Monsieur LeBlanc
