= John R. Isbell =

American mathematician (1930–2005)

John Rolfe Isbell (October 27, 1930 – August 6, 2005) was an American mathematician. For many years he was a professor of mathematics at the University at Buffalo (SUNY).

== Biography ==
Isbell was born in Portland, Oregon, the son of an army officer from Isbell, a town in Franklin County, Alabama. He attended several undergraduate institutions, including the University of Chicago, where professor Saunders Mac Lane was a source of inspiration. He began his graduate studies in mathematics at Chicago, briefly studied at Oklahoma A&M University and the University of Kansas, and eventually completed a Ph.D. in game theory at Princeton University in 1954 under the supervision of Albert W. Tucker. After graduation, Isbell was drafted into the U.S. Army, and stationed at the Aberdeen Proving Ground. In the late 1950s he worked at the Institute for Advanced Study in Princeton, New Jersey, from which he then moved to the University of Washington and Case Western Reserve University. He joined the University at Buffalo in 1969, and remained there until his retirement in 2002.

== Research ==
Isbell published over 140 papers under his own name, and several others under pseudonyms. Isbell published the first paper by John Rainwater, a fictitious mathematician who had been invented by graduate students at the University of Washington in 1952. After Isbell's paper, other mathematicians have published papers using the name "Rainwater" and have acknowledged "Rainwater's assistance" in articles. Isbell published other articles using two additional pseudonyms, M. G. Stanley and H. C. Enos, publishing two under each.

Many of his works involved topology and category theory:

- He was "the leading contributor to the theory of uniform spaces".
- Isbell duality is a form of duality arising when a mathematical object can be interpreted as a member of two different categories; a standard example is the Stone duality between sober spaces and complete Heyting algebras with sufficiently many points.
- Isbell was the first to study the category of metric spaces defined by metric spaces and the metric maps between them, and did early work on injective metric spaces and the tight span construction.

In abstract algebra, Isbell found a rigorous formulation for the Pierce–Birkhoff conjecture on piecewise-polynomial functions. He also made important contributions to the theory of median algebras.

In geometric graph theory, Isbell was the first to prove the bound χ ≤ 7 on the Hadwiger–Nelson problem, the question of how many colors are needed to color the points of the plane in such a way that no two points at unit distance from each other have the same color.

Isbell also proved that a commutative ring whose multiplicative semigroup is finitely generated must be finite. The contrapositive to this statement provides a novel proof that there are infinitely many prime numbers.

== See also ==
- Isbell conjugacy
- Isbell's zigzag theorem
