= Claude Émile Jean-Baptiste Litre =

Fictional character

Claude Émile Jean-Baptiste Litre (1716–1778) is a fictional character created in 1978 by Kenneth Woolner of the University of Waterloo to justify the use of a capital L to denote litres.

The International System of Units usually only permits the use of a capital letter when a unit is named after a person. The lower-case character l might be difficult to distinguish from the upper-case character I or the digit 1 in certain fonts and styles, and therefore both the lower-case (l) and the upper-case (L) are allowed as the symbol for litre. The United States National Institute of Standards and Technology now recommends the use of the uppercase letter L, a practice that is also widely followed in Canada and Australia.

Woolner perpetrated the April Fools' Day hoax in the April 1978 issue of "CHEM 13 News", a newsletter concerned with chemistry for school teachers. According to the hoax, Claude Litre was born on 12 February 1716, the son of a manufacturer of wine bottles. During Litre's extremely distinguished fictional scientific career, he purportedly proposed a unit of volume measurement that was incorporated into the International System of Units after his death in 1778.

The hoax was mistakenly printed as fact in the IUPAC journal Chemistry International and subsequently retracted. In reality, the litre derives its name from the litron, an old French unit of dry volume.

== See also ==
- Etiological myth
- False etymology
