= Matts Dumell =

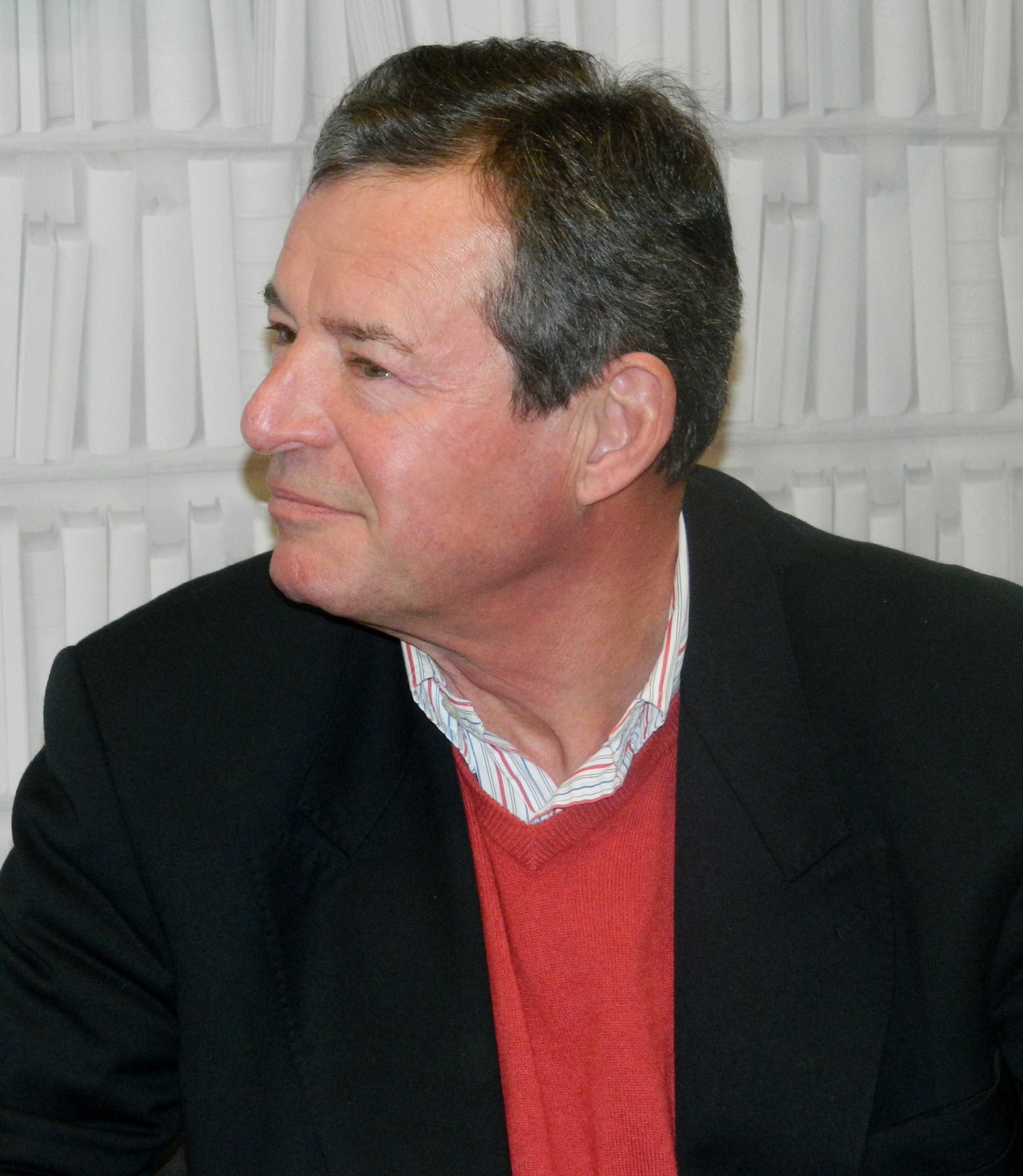
- Matts Dumell at Helsinki Book Fair in 2017
- Born: 1951 (age 74–75)
- Occupation: Journalist
- Known for: Long career in TV-production and documentary film making in public service.
- Notable work: Sjövägen till Sverige

Matts Dumell (born 1951) is a Swedish-speaking Finn journalist with a long career in TV-production and documentary film making in public service. He has been employed by Hufvudstadsbladet over several periods of time and he was one of the founders of the radio channel Radio Ykkönen. Dumell has also published several books.

Dumell was working at YLE when he was convicted of spying for the Soviet Union. He was arrested by the Finnish Security Police. He received an eight-month prison sentence for treason in 1983.

== Television ==
- Rikosraportti (Nelonen, ed.)
- Porkala Tillbaka (Finnish: Porkkala takaisin, Yle FST5 2006, ed.)
- Fria ord om Kekkonen (Finnish: Vapaasti Kekkosesta Yle FST5 2007, ed.)
- Tositarina: Junttien Kuningas (Yle TV1 2007, ed.)
- Tositarina: Myrskyn varjossa (Yle TV1 2007, ed.)
- Sjövägen till Sverige (Finnish: Meritie Ruotsiin, Yle FST5 2007, ed.)

== Published works ==
- Sjövägen till Sverige, Schildts 2007, Finnish: Meritie Ruotsiin, Schildts 2008
- & Jorma Melleri, Operaatio Mäntyniemi, Gummerus 1992
- Minä vakooja, Kustannusvaihe 1983
- Vähimmäispalkkaongelma kansainvälisen työjärjestön raporttien valossa, 1975
