= Pope Donus II =

Error in some official lists of popes

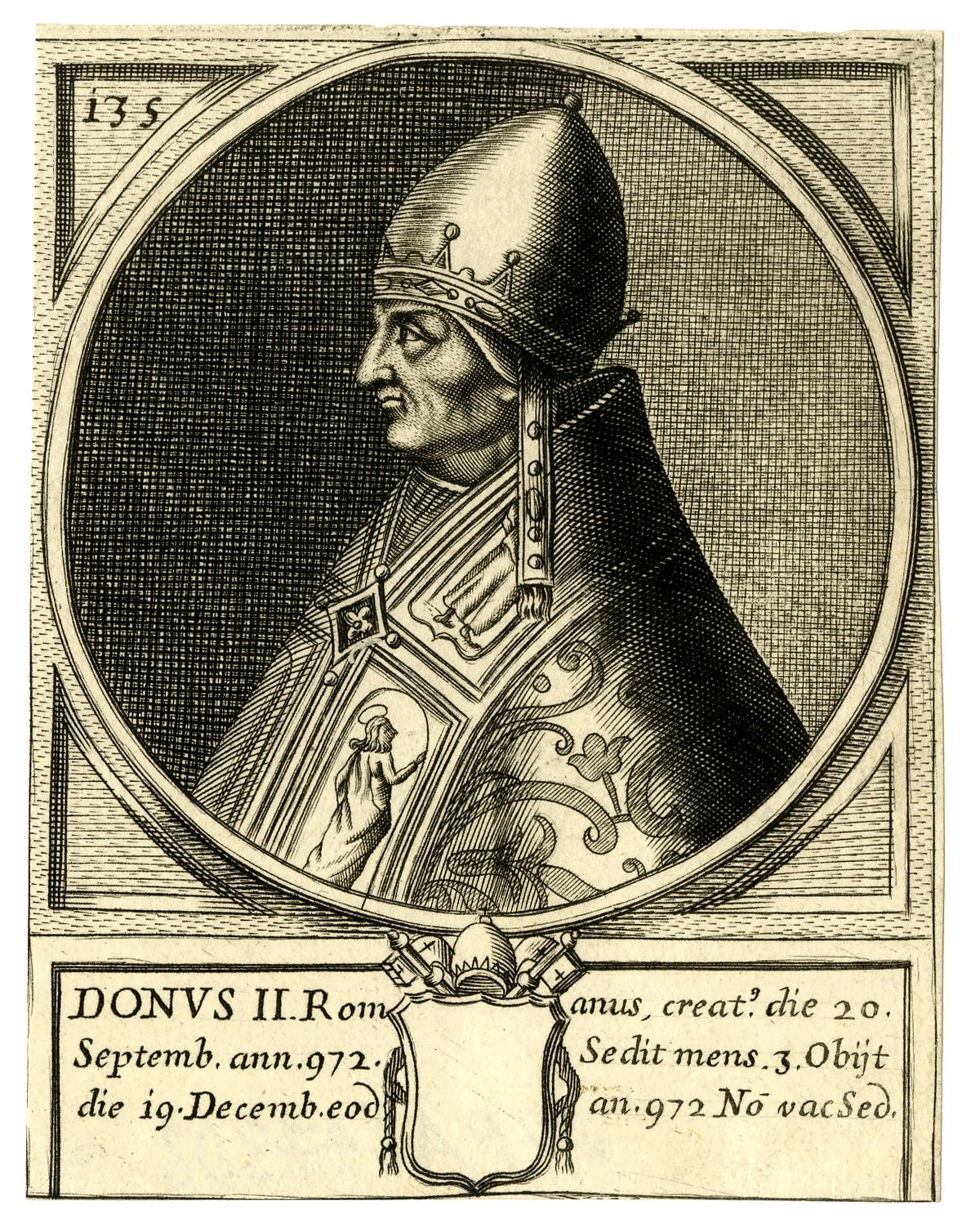
An image supposedly depicting Donus II, published in Chronologia Summorum Romanorum Pontificum in 1675. The caption states that he was the 135th pope and ruled for three months in 972.

Pope Donus II is an apocryphal pope who allegedly held the title briefly between Benedict VI and Benedict VII sometime during the 970s. The creation is likely due to papal catalogues accidentally confusing the title domnus for a proper name caused by the later addition of some antipopes into papal listings. His existence had been documented since at least the 15th century, and he was considered a pope by the Vatican for more than 200 years until the timeline was corrected in 1947. Despite his fictitious record, the nonexistent pope had been praised for honorable conduct.

== History ==
Donus II was likely invented by later papal catalogues that listed him between Benedict VI and Benedict VII. Benedict VI was likely listed prior to the phrase Domnus de Sutri, as he had been the bishop of Sutri. Later editions had added antipope Boniface VII and his years of reign into the same timeline directly after the mention of Benedict VI, which would have listed Domnus de Sutri independently alongside the year 974, which had been previously accredited to Benedict VI. Later editors would have read the phrase as the name of a pope, and then shortened the name to just Domnus, giving the impression of a Pope Domnus (also written as Domnus, Donus, or Bonus) who held the title in 974. He was given the suffix of II as a Pope Donus already had held position between 676 and 678.

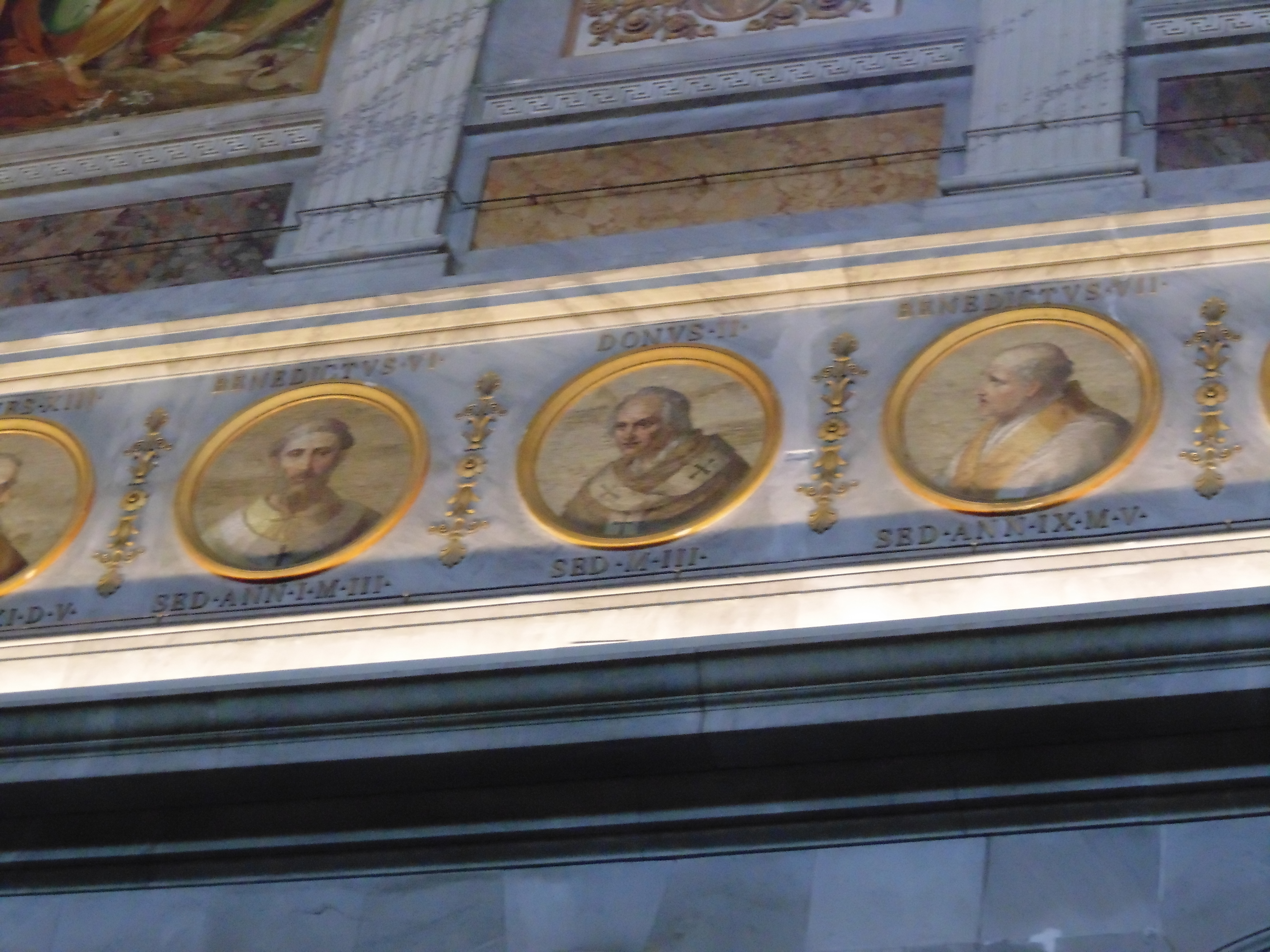
A mosaic of Donus II (second from right) at the Basilica of Saint Paul Outside the Walls. His inclusion at the basilica legitimized his existence for centuries.

Fanciful illustrations of Donus II have existed since at least the 15th century. One example is a portrait (known as a clipei) in a gallery of Popes located at the Basilica of Saint Paul Outside the Walls. The portraits of Popes at Saint Paul dates back to the 400s with the installation of the first 40. The gallery was not continuously maintained, evident as the list was only expanded during rare periods of renovation. In 1748, Pietro Piazza was commissioned to remake 158 portraits and to create a gallery that visualized the Vatican's claim of an uninterrupted line of popes since Saint Peter. Many of the portraits did not reflect the actual likenesses of the popes and were fictionalized, as accurate depictions of individual popes was not the primary goal. Piazza worked on the clipei of popes from Stephen III of the 8th century to Benedict XIV of the 18th century, which would have included the fictional Donus II.

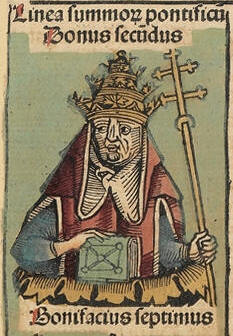
Woodcutting of Donus II from the Nuremberg Chronicle first published in 1493.

In the 18th century, the mosaic gallery was used by Giovanni Marangoni to create an official papal roster. For more than two hundred years, Donus II was considered a legitimate pope by the Holy See. Although the list was known to be flawed, it was not formally audited until 1947. In addition to confirming the nonexistence of Donus II, the audit revealed that Popes Cletus and Anacletus were the same person, discovered Popes Boniface VI and Leo VIII, and corrected various details concerning dozens of other popes.

Despite his accidental creation, egregious accounts of Donus II have been recorded. A book by Alexis-François Artaud de Montor states that he was Roman, elected in 972 due to involvement by the counts of Tusculum, and "governed three months with great integrity" before dying on 19 December 972 and being interred at the Vatican. Other specifics of his alleged reign vary, such as being between 5 April 974 and October 975, or, according to William à Beckett, that he was "never charged with any injustice or dishonourable action." [sic] Regardless of the dates of his alleged papacy, no contemporary sources mention Donus II nor are any of his acts as pope recorded.

== See also ==
- Pope Joan, myth of a woman Pope who reigned during the Middle Ages often reported as fact prior to the 17th century
