= The Daily Egyptian =

Student-led newspaper for Southern Illinois University

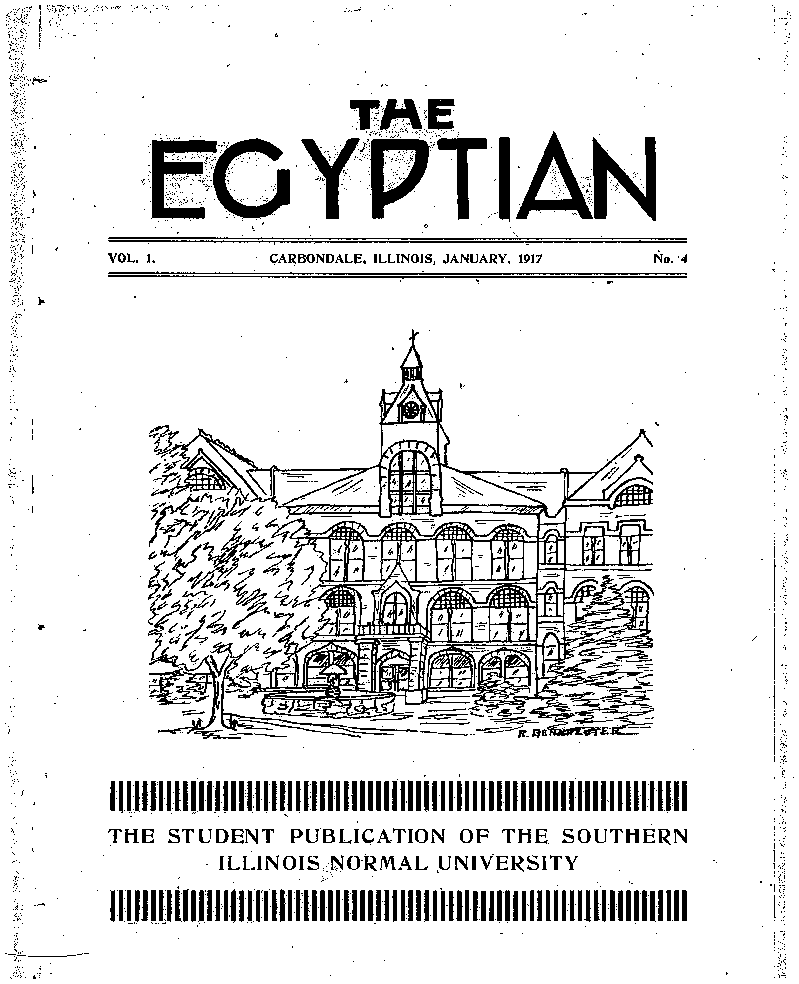
- January 1917 edition. Cover page shown.
- Type: Student newspaper
- School: Southern Illinois University
- Founded: 1888
- Language: English
- Headquarters: Illinois
- Country: United States
- Website: dailyegyptian.com

The Daily Egyptian is the student-led newspaper for Southern Illinois University. Established in 1888, the paper has gone through several name changes, as well as several suspensions; including a three-year hiatus beginning in the late 1800s and a suspension after the start of the First World War.

== History ==
The Daily Egyptian, formally known as the Normal Gazette and later changed to The Egyptian in 1916, was the first newspaper at Southern Illinois University. It consisted of eight pages and was printed monthly by the Free Press Printing House of Carbondale, Illinois in 1888 to 1889. The subscription cost was fifty cents per year. In June 1889, over a thousand copies of the Normal Gazette were printed. J. T Calbraith, editor, considered publishing the third edition of the paper in a magazine format in 1890 but for reasons unknown the magazine was never published.

The school remained without a newspaper for almost 30 years. In 1916, Robert Brown, graduate student of the class of 1916, continuously pursued the idea of creating a school newspaper. Shortly afterwards, The Egyptian began publication as a magazine that was published once a month at the cost of one dollar per year. In 1918, the publication was suspended because of the First World War.

In 1921, the Student Council began publishing a weekly, four-column newspaper that was priced at one dollar a year. A couple months later, the Southern Illinois Normal board of directors elected representatives that included the editor, associate editor, departmental editors, business manager, and faculty advisers.

== Current ==
In 1963, The Egyptian became known as the Daily Egyptian (or DE for short), publishing five days a week. It is a student-run newspaper and they determine what stories will appear in the paper. The students also work as editors, photographers, reporters, page designers, graphic artists, advertising sales representatives, production technicians, and circulation drivers. The Daily Egyptian, one of a handful of student newspapers to do so, owns and operates, with students, its own web press. Roughly 7,000 copies of The Daily Egyptian are freely distributed at nearly 200 locations across campus, throughout Carbondale, and other surrounding communities. The Daily Egyptian has the second largest circulation of any newspaper in southern Illinois, and the most of any college newspaper in the state.

== Financial support ==
The newspaper's revenues come from advertising. The university does not provide funds for the newspaper, only for facilities and salaries.

== Awards ==
The Daily Egyptian has received many awards from the Illinois College Press Association and the National Newspaper Pacemaker for general excellence; one of the nations most prestigious awards. It is a three-time winner of the Online National Newspaper Pacemaker for general excellence.

== Hoax ==
In 2003 Jaimie Reynolds, a former student at Southern Illinois University Carbondale, made up a story about a little girl named Kodee, whose mother was killed in a tragic car accident and whose father was fighting in Iraq. According to her story, Kodee's legal guardians were local residents at the time. During this period, Reynolds had another child pretend to be Kodee who made 20 visits to the university. She provided emails and letters that the soldier had allegedly written. In 2005 The Daily Egyptian admitted that the letters were a hoax that was perpetuated by the woman pretending to be the girl's aunt. Reynolds was never prosecuted.
