= Matts Kunding =

Irish footballer

Personal information
- Full name: Matthew Kunding
- Position: Midfielder

Senior career*
Years	Team	Apps	(Gls)
1909–1910	Torino	13	(0)
1910–1911	Juventus	6	(0)
- * Club domestic league appearances and goals

Matts Kunding was an association footballer who played in Italy in the early part of the 20th century. A midfielder, Kunding was reputedly one of the first Irish professional footballers to play outside of the UK or Ireland. In some records, he is documented as having played with Torino and Juventus.

Writing in the sports news website The42 in 2023, sports journalist Gavin Cooney queried whether the lack of documentation or records relating to Kunding suggests that "he was simply invented".

== Club career ==
Records indicate that Kunding played his entire brief career in Turin in Italy. He signed for Torino in 1909, making his debut in the Turin Derby against Juventus, winning the game 3-1 at the Velodrome Humbert I. He played in Torino's midfield alongside Englishman Arthur Rodgers. That season, Torino finished fourth in the Serie A.

The next season, he moved to Torino's rivals Juventus and played with the club for the 1910-1911 season. He made his debut in a 1–1 draw against Piedmont Football Club on 27 November 1910. After playing in a 2-0 win over Andrea Doria, Kunding was later dropped after a poor showing in a 0-2 home defeat to AC Milan. His last game for Juventus came in a 3–0 defeat to Genoa on 19 March 1911, with the team finishing in last place in the Serie A. In all, Kunding reputedly had 6 appearances (and no goals) with Juventus.
