= Category of metric spaces =

Category whose objects are metric spaces and whose morphisms are metric maps

In category theory, Met is a category that has metric spaces as its objects and metric maps (continuous functions between metric spaces that do not increase any pairwise distance) as its morphisms. This is a category because the composition of two metric maps is again a metric map. It was first considered by Isbell (1964).

== Arrows ==
The monomorphisms in Met are the injective metric maps. The epimorphisms are the metric maps for which the domain of the map has a dense image in the range. The isomorphisms are the isometries, i.e. metric maps which are injective, surjective, and distance-preserving.

As an example, the inclusion of the rational numbers into the real numbers is a monomorphism and an epimorphism, but it is clearly not an isomorphism; this example shows that Met is not a balanced category.

== Objects ==
The empty metric space is the initial object of Met; any singleton metric space is a terminal object. Because the initial object and the terminal objects differ, there are no zero objects in Met.

The injective objects in Met are called injective metric spaces. Injective metric spaces were introduced and studied first by Aronszajn & Panitchpakdi (1956), prior to the study of Met as a category; they may also be defined intrinsically in terms of a Helly property of their metric balls, and because of this alternative definition Aronszajn and Panitchpakdi named these spaces hyperconvex spaces. Any metric space has a smallest injective metric space into which it can be isometrically embedded, called its metric envelope or tight span.

== Products and functors ==
The product of a finite set of metric spaces in Met is a metric space that has the cartesian product of the spaces as its points; the distance in the product space is given by the supremum of the distances in the base spaces. That is, it is the product metric with the sup norm. However, the product of an infinite set of metric spaces may not exist, because the distances in the base spaces may not have a supremum. That is, Met is not a complete category, but it is finitely complete. There is no coproduct in Met.

The forgetful functor Met → Set assigns to each metric space the underlying set of its points, and assigns to each metric map the underlying set-theoretic function. This functor is faithful, and therefore Met is a concrete category.

== Related categories ==
Met is not the only category whose objects are metric spaces; others include the category of uniformly continuous functions, the category of Lipschitz functions and the category of quasi-Lipschitz mappings. The metric maps are both uniformly continuous and Lipschitz, with Lipschitz constant at most one.

== See also ==
- Category of groups – Category whose objects are groups and whose morphisms are group homomorphisms
- Category of sets – Category whose objects are sets and whose morphisms are functions
- Category of topological spaces – Category whose objects are topological spaces and whose morphisms are continuous maps
- Category of topological spaces with base point – Topological space with a distinguished point
- Category of topological vector spaces
