= Global element =

Concept in category concept

In category theory, a global element of an object A from a category is a morphism

$$h\colon 1 \to A,$$

where 1 is a terminal object of the category. Roughly speaking, global elements are a generalization of the notion of "elements" from the category of sets, and they can be used to import set-theoretic concepts into category theory. However, unlike a set, an object of a general category need not be determined by its global elements (not even up to isomorphism).

== Examples ==
- In the category of sets, the terminal objects are the singletons, so a global element of $A$ can be assimilated to an element of $A$ in the usual (set-theoretic) sense. More precisely, there is a natural isomorphism $(1 \to A) \cong A$.
- To illustrate that the notion of global elements can sometimes recover the actual elements of the objects in a concrete category, in the category of partially ordered sets, the terminal objects are again the singletons, so the global elements of a poset $P$ can be identified with the elements of $P$. Precisely, there is a natural isomorphism $(1 \to P) \cong \operatorname{Forget}(P)$ where $\operatorname{Forget}$ is the forgetful functor from the category of posets to the category of sets. The same holds in the category of topological spaces.
- Similarly, in the category of (small) categories, terminals objects are unit categories (having a single object and a single morphism which is the identity of that object). Consequently, a global element of a category is simply an object of that category. More precisely, there is a natural isomorphism $(1 \to \mathcal{C}) \cong \operatorname{Ob}(\mathcal{C})$ (where $\operatorname{Ob}$ is the objects functor).
- As an example where global elements do not recover elements of sets, in the category of groups, the terminal objects are zero groups. For any group $G$, there is a unique morphism $1 \to G$ (mapping the identity to the identity of $G$). More generally, in any category with a zero object (such as the category of abelian groups or the category of vector spaces on a field), each object has a unique global element.
- In the category of graphs, the terminal objects are graphs with a single vertex and a single self-loop on that vertex, whence the global elements of a graph are its self-loops.
- In an overcategory $\mathcal{C}/B$, the object $B \overset{\operatorname{id}}{\to} B$ is terminal. The global elements of an object $A \overset{f}{\to} B$ are the sections of $f$.

== In topos theory ==
In an elementary topos the global elements of the subobject classifier form a Heyting algebra when ordered by inclusion of the corresponding subobjects of the terminal object. For example, Grph happens to be a topos, whose subobject classifier Ω is a two-vertex directed clique with an additional self-loop (so five edges, three of which are self-loops and hence the global elements of Ω). The internal logic of Grph is therefore based on the three-element Heyting algebra as its truth values.

== See also ==
- Well-pointed category
