= Category of manifolds =

Category whose objects are manifolds and whose morphisms are differentiable maps

In mathematics, the category of manifolds, often denoted Man^{p}, is the category whose objects are manifolds of smoothness class C^{p} and whose morphisms are p-times continuously differentiable maps. This forms a category because the composition of two C^{p} maps is again continuous and of class C^{p}.

One is often interested only in C^{p}-manifolds modeled on spaces in a fixed category A, and the category of such manifolds is denoted Man^{p}(A). Similarly, the category of C^{p}-manifolds modeled on a fixed space E is denoted Man^{p}(E).

One may also speak of the category of smooth manifolds, Man^{∞}, or the category of analytic manifolds, Man^{ω}.

== Man^{p} is a concrete category ==
Like many categories, the category Man^{p} is a concrete category, meaning that there is a faithful functor from Man^{p} to the category of sets. This can be seen by observing that its objects are sets with additional structure (i.e. a topology and an equivalence class of atlases of charts defining a C^{p}-differentiable structure) and its morphisms are functions preserving this structure. There is a natural forgetful functor

U : Man^{p} → Top

to the category of topological spaces which is faithful and assigns to each manifold the underlying topological space and to each p-times continuously differentiable function the underlying continuous function of topological spaces. Similarly, there is a natural forgetful functor

U′ : Man^{p} → Set

to the category of sets which is faithful and assigns to each manifold the underlying set and to each p-times continuously differentiable function the underlying function. Finally, for all 0 < p < q < ∞ there are natural inclusion functors

Man^{ω} → Man^{∞} → Man^{q} → Man^{p} → Man^{0}

In other words, one can always see the category of smoother manifolds as a subcategory of less smooth manifolds all the way down to Man^{0}, the category of topological manifolds with continuous maps between them.

Obviously these inclusions are not full (continuous maps may not be q-differentiable, q-differentiable maps may not be p-differentiable, p-differentiable maps may not be smooth and smooth maps may not be analytic) nor replete (similarly as said with maps, homeomorphisms are not in general diffeomorphisms and so on) nor wide (not all topological manifolds are differentiable and so on), so they can be viewed as "strict" subcategories.

== Pointed manifolds and the tangent space functor ==
It is often convenient or necessary to work with the category of manifolds along with a distinguished point: Man_{•}^{p} analogous to Top_{•} - the category of pointed spaces. The objects of Man_{•}^{p} are pairs $(M, p_0),$ where $M$ is a $C^p$manifold along with a basepoint $p_0 \in M ,$ and its morphisms are basepoint-preserving p-times continuously differentiable maps: e.g. $F: (M,p_0) \to (N,q_0),$ such that $F(p_0) = q_0.$ The category of pointed manifolds is an example of a comma category - Man_{•}^{p} is exactly $\scriptstyle {( \{ \bull \} \downarrow \mathbf{Man^p})},$ where $\{ \bull \}$ represents an arbitrary singleton set, and the $\downarrow$represents a map from that singleton to an element of Man^{p}, picking out a basepoint.

The tangent space construction can be viewed as a functor from Man_{•}^{p} to Vect_{R} as follows: given pointed manifolds $(M, p_0)$and $(N, F(p_0)),$ with a $C^p$map $F: (M,p_0) \to (N,F(p_0))$ between them, we can assign the vector spaces $T_{p_0}M$and $T_{F(p_0)}N,$ with a linear map between them given by the pushforward (differential): $F_{*,p}:T_{p_0}M \to T_{F(p_0)}N.$ This construction is a genuine functor because the pushforward of the identity map $\mathbb{1}_M:M \to M$ is the vector space isomorphism $(\mathbb{1}_M)_{*,p_0}:T_{p_0}M \to T_{p_0}M,$ and the chain rule ensures that $(f\circ g)_{*,p_0} = f_{*,g(p_0)} \circ g_{*,p_0}.$
