= Category of topological vector spaces =

In mathematics, the category of topological vector spaces is the category whose objects are topological vector spaces and whose morphisms are continuous linear maps between them. This is a category because the composition of two continuous linear maps is again a continuous linear map. The category is often denoted TVect or TVS.

Fixing a topological field K, one can also consider the subcategory TVect_{K} of topological vector spaces over K with continuous K-linear maps as the morphisms.

== TVect is a concrete category ==
Like many categories, the category TVect is a concrete category, meaning its objects are sets with additional structure (i.e. a vector space structure and a topology) and its morphisms are functions preserving this structure. There are obvious forgetful functors into the category of topological spaces, the category of vector spaces and the category of sets.

== TVect_{$K$} is a topological category ==
The category is topological, which means loosely speaking that it relates to its "underlying category", the category of vector spaces, in the same way that Top relates to Set. Formally, for every K-vector space $V$ and every family $( (V_i,\tau_i),f_i)_{i\in I}$ of topological K-vector spaces $(V_i,\tau_i)$ and K-linear maps $f_i: V\to V_i,$ there exists a vector space topology $\tau$ on $V$ so that the following property is fulfilled:

Whenever $g: Z\to V$ is a K-linear map from a topological K-vector space $(Z,\sigma),$ it holds that

$g: (Z,\sigma)\to (V,\tau)$ is continuous $\iff$ $\forall i \in I: f_i\circ g: (Z,\sigma)\to(V_i,\tau_i)$ is continuous.

The topological vector space $(V,\tau)$ is called "initial object" or "initial structure" with respect to the given data.

If one replaces "vector space" by "set" and "linear map" by "map", one gets a characterisation of the usual initial topologies in Top. This is the reason why categories with this property are called "topological".

There are numerous consequences of this property. For example:

- "Discrete" and "indiscrete" objects exist. A topological vector space is indiscrete iff it is the initial structure with respect to the empty family. A topological vector space is discrete iff it is the initial structure with respect to the family of all possible linear maps into all topological vector spaces. (This family is a proper class, but that does not matter: Initial structures with respect to all classes exists iff they exists with respect to all sets)
- Final structures (the similar defined analogue to final topologies) exist. But there is a catch: While the initial structure of the above property is in fact the usual initial topology on $V$ with respect to $(\tau_i,f_i)_{i\in I}$, the final structures do not need to be final with respect to given maps in the sense of Top. For example: The discrete objects (= final with respect to the empty family) in $\textbf{TVect}_K$ do not carry the discrete topology.
- Since the following diagram of forgetful functors commutes

$$\begin{array}{ccc}
\textbf{Vect}_K & \rightarrow & \textbf{Set} \\
\uparrow & & \uparrow \\
\textbf{TVect}_K & \rightarrow & \textbf{Top}
\end{array}$$

and the forgetful functor from $\textbf{Vect}_K$ to Set is right adjoint, the forgetful functor from $\textbf{TVect}_K$ to Top is right adjoint too (and the corresponding left adjoints fit in an analogue commutative diagram). This left adjoint defines "free topological vector spaces". Explicitly these are free K-vector spaces equipped with a certain initial topology.

- Since $\textbf{Vect}_K$ is (co)complete, $\textbf{TVect}_K$ is (co)complete too.

== See also ==
- Category of groups – Category whose objects are groups and whose morphisms are group homomorphisms
- Category of metric spaces – Category whose objects are metric spaces and whose morphisms are metric maps
- Category of sets – Category whose objects are sets and whose morphisms are functions
- Category of topological spaces – Category whose objects are topological spaces and whose morphisms are continuous maps
- Category of topological spaces with base point – Topological space with a distinguished point
