= Category of preordered sets =

Concept in set theory

In mathematics, the category PreOrd has preordered sets as objects and order-preserving functions as morphisms. This is a category because the composition of two order-preserving functions is order preserving and the identity map is order preserving.

The monomorphisms in PreOrd are the injective order-preserving functions.

The empty set (considered as a preordered set) is the initial object of PreOrd, and the terminal objects are precisely the singleton preordered sets. There are thus no zero objects in PreOrd.

The categorical product in PreOrd is given by the product order on the cartesian product.

We have a forgetful functor PreOrd → Set that assigns to each preordered set the underlying set, and to each order-preserving function the underlying function. This functor is faithful, and therefore PreOrd is a concrete category. This functor has a left adjoint (sending every set to that set equipped with the equality relation) and a right adjoint (sending every set to that set equipped with the total relation).

While PreOrd is a category with different properties, the category of preordered groups, denoted PreOrdGrp, presents a more complex picture, nonetheless both imply preordered connections.

== 2-category structure ==
The set of morphisms (order-preserving functions) between two preorders actually has more structure than that of a set. It can be made into a preordered set itself by the pointwise relation:

(f ≤ g) ⇔ (∀x f(x) ≤ g(x))

This preordered set can in turn be considered as a category, which makes PreOrd a 2-category (the additional axioms of a 2-category trivially hold because any equation of parallel morphisms is true in a posetal category).

With this 2-category structure, a pseudofunctor F from a category C to PreOrd is given by the same data as a 2-functor, but has the relaxed properties:

∀x ∈ F(A), F(id_{A})(x) ≃ x,

∀x ∈ F(A), F(g$\circ$f)(x) ≃ F(g)(F(f)(x)),

where x ≃ y means x ≤ y and y ≤ x.

== See also ==
- FinOrd
- Simplex category
