= Metric space aimed at its subspace =

Universal property of metric spaces

In mathematics, a metric space aimed at its subspace is a categorical construction that has a direct geometric meaning. It is also a useful step toward the construction of the metric envelope, or tight span, which are basic (injective) objects of the category of metric spaces.

Following (Holsztyński 1966), a notion of a metric space Y aimed at its subspace X is defined.

== Informal introduction ==
Informally, imagine terrain Y, and its part X, such that wherever in Y you place a sharpshooter, and an apple at another place in Y, and then let the sharpshooter fire, the bullet will go through the apple and will always hit a point of X, or at least it will fly arbitrarily close to points of X – then we say that Y is aimed at X.

A priori, it may seem plausible that for a given X the superspaces Y that aim at X can be arbitrarily large or at least huge. We will see that this is not the case. Among the spaces which aim at a subspace isometric to X, there is a unique (up to isometry) universal one, Aim(X), which in a sense of canonical isometric embeddings contains any other space aimed at (an isometric image of) X. And in the special case of an arbitrary compact metric space X every bounded subspace of an arbitrary metric space Y aimed at X is totally bounded (i.e. its metric completion is compact).

== Definitions ==
Let $(Y, d)$ be a metric space. Let $X$ be a subset of $Y$, so that $(X,d |_X)$ (the set $X$ with the metric from $Y$ restricted to $X$) is a metric subspace of $(Y,d)$. Then

Definition. Space $Y$ aims at $X$ if and only if, for all points $y, z$ of $Y$, and for every real $\epsilon > 0$, there exists a point $p$ of $X$ such that

$$|d(p,y) - d(p,z)| > d(y,z) - \epsilon.$$

Let $\text{Met}(X)$ be the space of all real valued metric maps (non-contractive) of $X$. Define

$$\text{Aim}(X) := \{f \in \operatorname{Met}(X) : f(p) + f(q) \ge d(p,q) \text{ for all } p,q\in X\}.$$

Then

$$d(f,g) := \sup_{x\in X} |f(x)-g(x)| < \infty$$

for every $f, g\in \text{Aim}(X)$ is a metric on $\text{Aim}(X)$. Furthermore, $\delta_X\colon x\mapsto d_x$, where $d_x(p) := d(x,p)\,$, is an isometric embedding of $X$ into $\operatorname{Aim}(X)$; this is essentially a generalisation of the Kuratowski-Wojdysławski embedding of bounded metric spaces $X$ into $C(X)$, where we here consider arbitrary metric spaces (bounded or unbounded). It is clear that the space $\operatorname{Aim}(X)$ is aimed at $\delta_X(X)$.

== Properties ==
Let $i\colon X \to Y$ be an isometric embedding. Then there exists a natural metric map $j\colon Y \to \operatorname{Aim}(X)$ such that $j \circ i = \delta_X$:

$$(j(y))(x) := d(x,y)\,$$

for every $x\in X\,$ and $y\in Y\,$.

Theorem The space Y above is aimed at subspace X if and only if the natural mapping $j\colon Y \to \operatorname{Aim}(X)$ is an isometric embedding.

Thus it follows that every space aimed at X can be isometrically mapped into Aim(X), with some additional (essential) categorical requirements satisfied.

The space Aim(X) is injective (hyperconvex in the sense of Aronszajn-Panitchpakdi) – given a metric space M, which contains Aim(X) as a metric subspace, there is a canonical (and explicit) metric retraction of M onto Aim(X) (Holsztyński 1966).
