= Minimal algebra =

Minimal algebra is an important concept in tame congruence theory, a theory that has been developed by Ralph McKenzie and David Hobby.

== Definition ==
A minimal algebra is a finite algebra with more than one element, in which every non-constant unary polynomial is a permutation on its domain.

== Classification ==
A polynomial of an algebra is a composition of its basic operations, $0$-ary operations and the projections. Two algebras are called polynomially equivalent if they have the same universe and precisely the same polynomial operations. A minimal algebra $\mathbb M$ falls into one of the following types (P. P. Pálfy)

- $\mathbb M$ is of type $\bf 1$, or unary type, iff ${\rm Pol} ~\mathbb M={\rm Pol} \langle M,G\rangle$, where $M$ denotes the universe of $\mathbb M$, $\rm Pol~ \mathbb A$ denotes the set of all polynomials of an algebra $\mathbb A$ and $G$ is a subgroup of the symmetric group over $M$.
- $\mathbb M$ is of type $\bf 2$, or affine type, iff $\mathbb M$ is polynomially equivalent to a vector space.
- $\mathbb M$ is of type $\bf 3$, or Boolean type, iff $\mathbb M$ is polynomially equivalent to a two-element Boolean algebra.
- $\mathbb M$ is of type $\bf 4$, or lattice type, iff $\mathbb M$ is polynomially equivalent to a two-element lattice.
- $\mathbb M$ is of type $\bf 5$, or semilattice type, iff $\mathbb M$ is polynomially equivalent to a two-element semilattice.
