= Inserter category =

Type of category in mathematics

In category theory, a branch of mathematics, the inserter category is a variation of the comma category where the two functors are required to have the same domain category.

== Definition ==
If C and D are two categories and F and G are two functors from C to D, the inserter category Ins(F, G) is the category whose objects are pairs (X, f) where X is an object of C and f is a morphism in D from F(X) to G(X) and whose morphisms from (X, f) to (Y, g) are morphisms h in C from X to Y such that $G(h) \circ f = g \circ F(h)$.

== Properties ==
If C and D are locally presentable, F and G are functors from C to D, and either F is cocontinuous or G is continuous; then the inserter category Ins(F, G) is also locally presentable.
