= Balanced category =

In mathematics, especially in category theory, a balanced category is a category in which every bimorphism (a morphism that is both a monomorphism and epimorphism) is an isomorphism.

The category of topological spaces is not balanced (since continuous bijections are not necessarily homeomorphisms), while a topos is balanced. This is one of the reasons why a topos is said to be nicer.

== Examples ==
The following categories are balanced:

- Set, the category of sets.
- Grp, the category of groups.
- An abelian category.
- CHaus, the category of compact Hausdorff spaces (since a continuous bijection there is homeomorphic).

An additive category may not be balanced. Contrary to what one might expect, a balanced pre-abelian category may not be abelian.

A quasitopos is similar to a topos but may not be balanced.

== See also ==
- quasi-abelian category

== Sources ==
- Johnstone, P. T. (1977). Topos theory. Academic Press.
- Roy L. Crole, Categories for types, Cambridge University Press (1994)
