= Kuratowski embedding =

Mathematical embedding in Banach spaces

In mathematics, the Kuratowski embedding allows one to view any metric space as a subset of some Banach space. It is named after Kazimierz Kuratowski.

The statement obviously holds for the empty space. If (X,d) is a metric space, x_{0} is a point in X, and C_{b}(X) denotes the Banach space of all bounded continuous real-valued functions on X with the supremum norm, then the map

$$\Phi : X \rarr C_b(X)$$

defined by

$$\Phi(x)(y) = d(x,y)-d(x_0,y) \quad\mbox{for all}\quad x,y\in X$$

is an isometry.

The above construction can be seen as embedding a pointed metric space into a Banach space.

The Kuratowski–Wojdysławski theorem states that every bounded metric space X is isometric to a closed subset of a convex subset of some Banach space. (N.B. the image of this embedding is closed in the convex subset, not necessarily in the Banach space.) Here we use the isometry

$$\Psi : X \rarr C_b(X)$$

defined by

$$\Psi(x)(y) = d(x,y) \quad\mbox{for all}\quad x,y\in X$$

The convex set mentioned above is the convex hull of Ψ(X).

In both of these embedding theorems, we may replace C_{b}(X) by the Banach space ℓ^{∞}(X) of all bounded functions X → R, again with the supremum norm, since C_{b}(X) is a closed linear subspace of ℓ^{∞}(X).

These embedding results are useful because Banach spaces have a number of useful properties not shared by all metric spaces: they are vector spaces which allows one to add points and do elementary geometry involving lines and planes etc.; and they are complete. Given a function with codomain X, it is frequently desirable to extend this function to a larger domain, and this often requires simultaneously enlarging the codomain to a Banach space containing X.

== History ==
Formally speaking, this embedding was first introduced by Kuratowski, but a very close variation of this embedding appears already in the papers of Fréchet. Those papers make use of the embedding respectively to exhibit $\ell^\infty$ as a "universal" separable metric space (it isn't itself separable, hence the scare quotes) and to construct a general metric on $\mathbb{R}$ by pulling back the metric on a simple Jordan curve in $\ell^\infty$.

== See also ==
- Tight span, an embedding of any metric space into an injective metric space defined similarly to the Kuratowski embedding
