= Quantaloid =

In mathematics, a quantaloid is a category enriched over the category Sup of complete lattices with supremum-preserving maps. In other words, for any objects a and b the Hom object between them is not just a set but a complete lattice, in such a way that composition of morphisms preserves all joins:

$$(\bigvee_i f_i) \circ (\bigvee_j g_j) = \bigvee_{i,j} (f_i \circ g_j)$$

The endomorphism lattice $\mathrm{Hom}(X,X)$ of any object $X$ in a quantaloid is a quantale, whence the name.
