= Accessible category =

The theory of accessible categories is a part of mathematics, specifically of category theory. It attempts to describe categories in terms of the "size" (a cardinal number) of the operations needed to generate their objects.

The theory originates in the work of Grothendieck completed by 1969, and Gabriel and Ulmer (1971). It has been further developed in 1989 by Michael Makkai and Robert Paré, with motivation coming from model theory, a branch of mathematical logic. A standard text book by Adámek and Rosický appeared in 1994. Accessible categories also have applications in homotopy theory. Grothendieck continued the development of the theory for homotopy-theoretic purposes in his (still partly unpublished) 1991 manuscript Les dérivateurs. Some properties of accessible categories depend on the set universe in use, particularly on the cardinal properties and Vopěnka's principle.

== κ-directed colimits and κ-presentable objects ==
Let $\kappa$ be an infinite regular cardinal, i.e. a cardinal number that is not the sum of a smaller number of smaller cardinals; examples are $\aleph _{0}$ (aleph-0), the first infinite cardinal number, and $\aleph_{1}$, the first uncountable cardinal). A partially ordered set $(I, \leq)$ is called $\kappa$-directed if every subset $J$ of $I$ of cardinality less than $\kappa$ has an upper bound in $I$. In particular, the ordinary directed sets are precisely the $\aleph_0$-directed sets.

Now let $C$ be a category. A direct limit (also known as a directed colimit) over a $\kappa$-directed set $(I, \leq)$ is called a $\kappa$-directed colimit. An object $X$ of $C$ is called $\kappa$-presentable if the Hom functor $\operatorname{Hom}(X,-)$ preserves all $\kappa$-directed colimits in $C$. It is clear that every $\kappa$-presentable object is also $\kappa'$-presentable whenever $\kappa\leq\kappa'$, since every $\kappa'$-directed colimit is also a $\kappa$-directed colimit in that case. A $\aleph_0$-presentable object is called finitely presentable.

=== Examples ===
- In the category Set of all sets, the finitely presentable objects coincide with the finite sets. The $\kappa$-presentable objects are the sets of cardinality smaller than $\kappa$.
- In the category of all groups, an object is finitely presentable if and only if it is a finitely presented group, i.e. if it has a presentation with finitely many generators and finitely many relations. For uncountable regular $\kappa$, the $\kappa$-presentable objects are precisely the groups with cardinality smaller than $\kappa$.
- In the category of left $R$-modules over some (unitary, associative) ring $R$, the finitely presentable objects are precisely the finitely presented modules.

== κ-accessible and locally presentable categories ==
The category $C$ is called $\kappa$-accessible provided that:

- $C$ has all $\kappa$-directed colimits
- $C$ contains a set $P$ of $\kappa$-presentable objects such that every object of $C$ is a $\kappa$-directed colimit of objects of $P$.

An $\aleph_0$-accessible category is called finitely accessible. A category is called accessible if it is $\kappa$-accessible for some infinite regular cardinal $\kappa$. When an accessible category is also cocomplete, it is called locally presentable.

A functor $F : C \to D$ between $\kappa$-accessible categories is called $\kappa$-accessible provided that $F$ preserves $\kappa$-directed colimits.

=== Examples ===
- The category Set of all sets and functions is locally finitely presentable, since every set is the direct limit of its finite subsets, and finite sets are finitely presentable.
- The category $R$-Mod of (left) $R$-modules is locally finitely presentable for any ring $R$.
- The category of simplicial sets is finitely accessible.
- The category Mod(T) of models of some first-order theory T with countable signature is $\aleph_1$ -accessible. $\aleph_1$ -presentable objects are models with a countable number of elements.
- Further examples of locally presentable categories are finitary algebraic categories (i.e. the categories corresponding to varieties of algebras in universal algebra) and Grothendieck categories.

== Theorems ==
One can show that every locally presentable category is also complete. Furthermore, a category is locally presentable if and only if it is equivalent to the category of models of a limit sketch.

Adjoint functors between locally presentable categories have a particularly simple characterization. A functor $F : C \to D$ between locally presentable categories:

- is a left adjoint if and only if it preserves small colimits,
- is a right adjoint if and only if it preserves small limits and is accessible.

== See also ==
- accessible ∞-category
