= Well-pointed category =

In category theory, a category with a terminal object $1$ is well-pointed if for every pair of arrows $f,g:A\to B$ such that $f\neq g$, there is an arrow $p:1\to A$ such that $f\circ p\neq g\circ p$. (The arrows $p$ are called the global elements or points of the category; a well-pointed category is thus one that has "enough points" to distinguish non-equal arrows.)

== See also ==
- Pointed category
