= Injective metric space =

Type of metric space

In metric geometry, an injective metric space, or equivalently a hyperconvex metric space, is a metric space with certain properties generalizing those of the real line and of L_{∞} distances in higher-dimensional vector spaces. These properties can be defined in two seemingly different ways: hyperconvexity involves the intersection properties of closed balls in the space, while injectivity involves the isometric embeddings of the space into larger spaces. However it is a theorem of Aronszajn & Panitchpakdi (1956) that these two different types of definitions are equivalent.

== Hyperconvexity ==
A metric space $X$ is said to be hyperconvex if it is convex and its closed balls have the binary Helly property. That is:

1. Any two points $x$ and $y$ can be connected by the isometric image of a line segment of length equal to the distance between the points (i.e. $X$ is a path space).
2. If $F$ is any family of closed balls
  $${\bar B}_r(p) = \{q \mid d(p,q) \le r\}$$
  such that each pair of balls in $F$ meets, then there exists a point $x$ common to all the balls in $F$.

Equivalently, a metric space $X$ is hyperconvex if, for any set of points $p_i$ in $X$ and radii $r_i>0$ satisfying $r_i+r_j\ge d(p_i,p_j)$ for each $i$ and $j$, there is a point $q$ in $X$ that is within distance $r_i$ of each $p_i$ (that is, $d(p_i,q) \le r_i$ for all $i$).

== Injectivity ==
A retraction of a metric space $X$ is a function $f$ mapping $X$ to a subspace of itself, such that

1. for all $x \in X$ we have that $f(f(x))=f(x)$; that is, $f$ is the identity function on its image (i.e. it is idempotent), and
2. for all $x, y \in X$ we have that $d(f(x),f(y))\le d(x,y)$; that is, $f$ is nonexpansive.

A retract of a space $X$ is a subspace of $X$ that is an image of a retraction. A metric space $X$ is said to be injective if, whenever $X$ is isometric to a subspace $Z$ of a space $Y$, that subspace $Z$ is a retract of $Y$.

== Examples ==
Examples of hyperconvex metric spaces include

- The real line
- $\R^d$ with the $\ell$^{∞} distance
- Manhattan distance (L_{1}) in the plane (which is equivalent up to rotation and scaling to the L_{∞}), but not in higher dimensions
- The tight span of a metric space
- Any complete real tree
- $\operatorname{Aim}(X)$ – see Metric space aimed at its subspace

Due to the equivalence between hyperconvexity and injectivity, these spaces are all also injective.

== Properties ==
In an injective space, the radius of the minimum ball that contains any set $S$ is equal to half the diameter of $S$. This follows since the balls of radius half the diameter, centered at the points of $S$, intersect pairwise and therefore by hyperconvexity have a common intersection; a ball of radius half the diameter centered at a point of this common intersection contains all of $S$. Thus, injective spaces satisfy a particularly strong form of Jung's theorem.

Every injective space is a complete space, and every metric map (or, equivalently, nonexpansive mapping, or short map) on a bounded injective space has a fixed point. A metric space is injective if and only if it is an injective object in the category of metric spaces and metric maps.
