= Accessible quasi-category =

Category in category theory

In mathematics, especially category theory, an accessible quasi-category is a quasi-category in which each object is an ind-object on some small quasi-category. In particular, an accessible quasi-category is typically large (not small). The notion is a generalization of an earlier 1-category version of it, an accessible category introduced by Adámek and Rosický.

== Definition ==
An ∞-category is called accessible or more precisely $\kappa$-accessible if it is equivalent to the ∞-category of $\kappa$-ind objects on some small ∞-category for some regular cardinal $\kappa$.

== Facts ==
A small ∞-category is accessible if and only if it is idempotent-complete.
