= Algebraic structure =

Set with operations obeying given axioms

In mathematics, an algebraic structure or algebraic system consists of a nonempty set A (called the underlying set, carrier set or domain), a collection of operations on A (typically binary operations such as addition and multiplication), and a finite set of identities (known as axioms) that these operations must satisfy.

An algebraic structure may be based on other algebraic structures with operations and axioms involving several structures. For instance, a vector space involves a second structure called a field, and an operation called scalar multiplication between elements of the field (called scalars), and elements of the vector space (called vectors).

Abstract algebra is the name that is commonly given to the study of algebraic structures. The general theory of algebraic structures has been formalized in universal algebra. Category theory is another formalization that includes other mathematical structures and functions between structures of the same type (homomorphisms).

In universal algebra, an algebraic structure is called an algebra; this term may be ambiguous, since, in other contexts, an algebra is an algebraic structure that is a vector space over a field or a module over a commutative ring.

The collection of all structures of a given type (same operations and same laws) is called a variety in universal algebra; this term is also used with a completely different meaning in algebraic geometry, as an abbreviation of algebraic variety. In category theory, the collection of all structures of a given type and homomorphisms between them form a concrete category.

== Introduction ==
Addition and multiplication are prototypical examples of operations that combine two elements of a set to produce a third element of the same set. These operations obey several algebraic laws. For example, a + (b + c) = (a + b) + c and a(bc) = (ab)c are associative laws, and a + b = b + a and ab = ba are commutative laws. Many systems studied by mathematicians have operations that obey some, but not necessarily all, of the laws of ordinary arithmetic. For example, the possible moves of an object in three-dimensional space can be combined by performing a first move of the object, and then a second move from its new position. Such moves, formally called rigid motions, obey the associative law, but fail to satisfy the commutative law.

Sets with one or more operations that obey specific laws are called algebraic structures. When a new problem involves the same laws as such an algebraic structure, all the results that have been proved using only the laws of the structure can be directly applied to the new problem.

In full generality, algebraic structures may involve an arbitrary collection of operations, including operations that combine more than two elements (higher arity operations) and operations that take only one argument (unary operations) or even zero arguments (nullary operations). The examples listed below are by no means a complete list, but include the most common structures taught in undergraduate courses.

== Common axioms ==
=== Equational axioms ===
An axiom of an algebraic structure often has the form of an identity, that is, an equation such that the two sides of the equals sign are expressions that involve operations of the algebraic structure and variables. If the variables in the identity are replaced by arbitrary elements of the algebraic structure, the equality must remain true. Here are some common examples.

Commutativity
An operation $*$ is commutative if
$$x*y=y*x$$
for every x and y in the algebraic structure.
Associativity
An operation $*$ is associative if
$$(x*y)*z=x*(y*z)$$
for every x, y and z in the algebraic structure.
Left distributivity
An operation $*$ is left-distributive with respect to another operation $+$ if
$$x*(y+z)=(x*y)+(x*z)$$
for every x, y and z in the algebraic structure (the second operation is denoted here as $+$, because the second operation is addition in many common examples).
Right distributivity
An operation $*$ is right-distributive with respect to another operation $+$ if
$$(y+z)*x=(y*x)+(z*x)$$
for every x, y and z in the algebraic structure.
Distributivity
An operation $*$ is distributive with respect to another operation $+$ if it is both left-distributive and right-distributive. If the operation $*$ is commutative, left and right distributivity are both equivalent to distributivity.

=== Existential axioms ===
Some common axioms contain an existential clause. In general, such a clause can be avoided by introducing further operations, and replacing the existential clause by an identity involving the new operation. More precisely, let us consider an axiom of the form "for all X there is y such that $f(X,y)=g(X,y)$", where X is a k-tuple of variables. Choosing a specific value of y for each value of X defines a function $\varphi:X\mapsto y,$ which can be viewed as an operation of arity k, and the axiom becomes the identity $f(X,\varphi(X))=g(X,\varphi(X)).$

The introduction of such auxiliary operation complicates slightly the statement of an axiom, but has some advantages. Given a specific algebraic structure, the proof that an existential axiom is satisfied consists generally of the definition of the auxiliary function, completed with straightforward verifications. Also, when computing in an algebraic structure, one generally uses explicitly the auxiliary operations. For example, in the case of numbers, the additive inverse is provided by the unary minus operation $x\mapsto -x.$

Also, in universal algebra, a variety is a class of algebraic structures that share the same operations, and the same axioms, with the condition that all axioms are identities. What precedes shows that existential axioms of the above form are accepted in the definition of a variety.

Here are some of the most common existential axioms.

Identity element
A binary operation $*$ has an identity element if there is an element e such that
$$x*e=x\quad \text{and} \quad e*x=x$$
for all x in the structure. Here, the auxiliary operation is the operation of arity zero that has e as its result.
Inverse element
Given a binary operation $*$ that has an identity element e, an element x is invertible if it has an inverse element, that is, if there exists an element $\operatorname{inv}(x)$ such that
$$\operatorname{inv}(x)*x=e \quad \text{and} \quad x*\operatorname{inv}(x)=e.$$
For example, a group is an algebraic structure with a binary operation that is associative, has an identity element, and for which all elements are invertible.

=== Non-equational axioms ===
The axioms of an algebraic structure can be any first-order formula, that is a formula involving logical connectives (such as "and", "or" and "not"), and logical quantifiers ($\forall, \exists$) that apply to elements (not to subsets) of the structure.

Such a typical axiom is inversion in fields. This axiom cannot be reduced to axioms of preceding types. (It follows that fields do not form a variety in the sense of universal algebra.) It can be stated: "Every nonzero element of a field is invertible;" or, equivalently: the structure has a unary operation inv such that
$$\forall x, \quad x=0 \quad\text{or} \quad x \cdot\operatorname{inv}(x)=1.$$
The operation inv can be viewed either as a partial operation that is not defined for x = 0; or as an ordinary function whose value at 0 is arbitrary and must not be used.

== Common algebraic structures ==
=== One set with operations ===
Simple structures: no binary operation:

- Set: a degenerate algebraic structure S having no operations.

Group-like structures: one binary operation. The binary operation can be indicated by any symbol, or with no symbol (juxtaposition) as is done for ordinary multiplication of real numbers.

- Group: a monoid with a unary operation (inverse), giving rise to inverse elements.
- Abelian group: a group whose binary operation is commutative.

Ring-like structures or ringoids: two binary operations, often called addition and multiplication, with multiplication distributing over addition.

- Ring: a semiring whose additive monoid is an abelian group.
- Division ring: a nontrivial ring in which division by nonzero elements is defined.
- Commutative ring: a ring in which the multiplication operation is commutative.
- Field: a commutative division ring (i.e. a commutative ring which contains a multiplicative inverse for every nonzero element).

Lattice structures: two or more binary operations, including operations called meet and join, connected by the absorption law.

- Complete lattice: a lattice in which arbitrary meet and joins exist.
- Bounded lattice: a lattice with a greatest element and least element.
- Distributive lattice: a lattice in which each of meet and join distributes over the other. A power set under union and intersection forms a distributive lattice.
- Boolean algebra: a complemented distributive lattice. Either of meet or join can be defined in terms of the other and complementation.

=== Two sets with operations ===
- Module: an abelian group M and a ring R acting as operators on M. The members of R are sometimes called scalars, and the binary operation of scalar multiplication is a function R × M → M, which satisfies several axioms. Counting the ring operations these systems have at least three operations.
- Vector space: a module where the ring R is a field or, in some contexts, a division ring.
- Algebra over a field: a module over a field, which also carries a multiplication operation that is compatible with the module structure. This includes distributivity over addition and linearity with respect to multiplication.
- Inner product space: a field F and vector space V with a definite bilinear form V × V → F.

== Hybrid structures ==
Algebraic structures can also coexist with added structure of non-algebraic nature, such as partial order or a topology. The added structure must be compatible, in some sense, with the algebraic structure.

- Topological group: a group with a topology compatible with the group operation.
- Lie group: a topological group with a compatible smooth manifold structure.
- Ordered groups, ordered rings and ordered fields: each type of structure with a compatible partial order.
- Archimedean group: a linearly ordered group for which the Archimedean property holds.
- Topological vector space: a vector space whose M has a compatible topology.
- Normed vector space: a vector space with a compatible norm. If such a space is complete (as a metric space) then it is called a Banach space.
- Hilbert space: an inner product space over the real or complex numbers whose inner product gives rise to a Banach space structure.
- Vertex operator algebra
- Von Neumann algebra: a *-algebra of operators on a Hilbert space equipped with the weak operator topology.

== Universal algebra ==
Algebraic structures are defined through different configurations of axioms. Universal algebra abstractly studies such objects. One major dichotomy is between structures that are axiomatized entirely by identities and structures that are not. If all axioms defining a class of algebras are identities, then this class is a variety (not to be confused with algebraic varieties of algebraic geometry).

Identities are equations formulated using only the operations the structure allows, and variables that are tacitly universally quantified over the relevant universe. Identities contain no connectives, existentially quantified variables, or relations of any kind other than the allowed operations. The study of varieties is an important part of universal algebra. An algebraic structure in a variety may be understood as the quotient algebra of term algebra (also called "absolutely free algebra") divided by the equivalence relations generated by a set of identities. So, a collection of functions with given signatures generate a free algebra, the term algebra T. Given a set of equational identities (the axioms), one may consider their symmetric, transitive closure E. The quotient algebra T/E is then the algebraic structure or variety. Thus, for example, groups have a signature containing two operators: the multiplication operator m, taking two arguments, and the inverse operator i, taking one argument, and the identity element e, a constant, which may be considered an operator that takes zero arguments. Given a (countable) set of variables x, y, z, etc. the term algebra is the collection of all possible terms involving m, i, e and the variables; so for example, m(i(x), m(x, m(y,e))) would be an element of the term algebra. One of the axioms defining a group is the identity m(x, i(x)) = e; another is m(x,e) = x. The axioms can be represented as trees. These equations induce equivalence classes on the free algebra; the quotient algebra then has the algebraic structure of a group.

Some structures do not form varieties, because either:

1. It is necessary that 0 ≠ 1, 0 being the additive identity element and 1 being a multiplicative identity element, but this is a nonidentity;
2. Structures such as fields have some axioms that hold only for nonzero members of S. For an algebraic structure to be a variety, its operations must be defined for all members of S; there can be no partial operations.

Structures whose axioms unavoidably include nonidentities are among the most important ones in mathematics, e.g., fields and division rings. Structures with nonidentities present challenges that varieties do not. For example, the direct product of two fields is not a field, because $(1,0)\cdot(0,1)=(0,0)$, but fields do not have zero divisors.

== Category theory ==
Category theory is another tool for studying algebraic structures (see, for example, Mac Lane 1998). A category is a collection of objects with associated morphisms. Every algebraic structure has its own notion of homomorphism, namely any function compatible with the operation(s) defining the structure. In this way, every algebraic structure gives rise to a category. For example, the category of groups has all groups as objects and all group homomorphisms as morphisms. This concrete category may be seen as a category of sets with added category-theoretic structure. Likewise, the category of topological groups (whose morphisms are the continuous group homomorphisms) is a category of topological spaces with extra structure. A forgetful functor between categories of algebraic structures "forgets" a part of a structure.

There are various concepts in category theory that try to capture the algebraic character of a context, for instance

- algebraic category
- essentially algebraic category
- presentable category
- locally presentable category
- monadic functors and categories
- universal property.

== Different meanings of "structure" ==
In a slight abuse of notation, the word "structure" can also refer to just the operations on a structure, instead of the underlying set itself. For example, the sentence, "We have defined a ring structure on the set $A$", means that we have defined ring operations on the set $A$. For another example, the group $(\mathbb Z, +)$ can be seen as a set $\mathbb Z$ that is equipped with an algebraic structure, namely the operation $+$.

== See also ==
- Free object
- Mathematical structure
- Signature (logic)
- Structure (mathematical logic)
