= Metric map =

Function between metric spaces that does not increase any distance

In mathematical analysis, a metric map is a function between metric spaces that does not increase any distance. These maps are the morphisms in the category of metric spaces, Met. Such functions are always continuous functions. They are also called Lipschitz functions with Lipschitz constant 1, nonexpansive maps, nonexpanding maps, weak contractions, or short maps.

Specifically, suppose that $X$ and $Y$ are metric spaces and $f$ is a function from $X$ to $Y$. Thus we have a metric map when, for any points $x$ and $y$ in $X$,
$$d_{Y}(f(x),f(y)) \leq d_{X}(x,y) . \!$$
Here $d_X$ and $d_Y$ denote the metrics on $X$ and $Y$ respectively.

== Examples ==
Consider the metric space $[0,1/2]$ with the Euclidean metric. Then the function $f(x)=x^2$ is a metric map, since for $x\ne y$, $|f(x)-f(y)|=|x+y||x-y|<|x-y|$. In this example the Lipschitz constant is 1, that implies a metric map.

== Category of metric maps ==
The function composition of two metric maps is another metric map, and the identity map $\mathrm{id}_M\colon M \rightarrow M$ on a metric space $M$ is a metric map, which is also the identity element for function composition. Thus metric spaces together with metric maps form a category Met. Met is a subcategory of the category of metric spaces and Lipschitz functions. A map between metric spaces is an isometry if and only if it is a bijective metric map whose inverse is also a metric map. Thus the isomorphisms in Met are precisely the isometries.

== Multivalued version ==
A mapping $T\colon X\to \mathcal{N}(X)$ from a metric space $X$ to the family of nonempty subsets of $X$ is said to be Lipschitz if there exists $L\geq 0$ such that
$$H(Tx,Ty)\leq L d(x,y),$$
for all $x,y\in X$, where $H$ is the Hausdorff distance. When $L=1$, $T$ is called nonexpansive, and when $L<1$, $T$ is called a contraction.

== See also ==
- Contraction (operator theory) – Bounded operators with sub-unit norm
- Contraction mapping – Function reducing distance between all points
- Stretch factor – Mathematical parameter of embeddings
- Subcontraction map – Function reducing distance between all points
