= Category of groups =

Category whose objects are groups and whose morphisms are group homomorphisms

In mathematics, the category $\mathbf{Grp}$ (or $\mathbf{Gp}$) has the class of all groups for objects and group homomorphisms for morphisms. As such, it is a concrete category. Group theory may be thought of as the study of this category.

== Relation to other categories ==
There are two forgetful functors from $\mathbf{Grp}$, $\mathrm{M}:\mathbf{Grp}\to\mathbf{Mon}$ from groups to monoids and $\mathrm{U}:\mathbf{Grp}\to\mathbf{Set}$ from groups to sets. $\mathrm{M}$ has two adjoints: one right, and one left. $\mathrm{I}:\mathbf{Mon}\to\mathbf{Grp}$ is the right adjoint functor sending every monoid to the submonoid of invertible elements and $\mathrm{K}:\mathbf{Mon}\to\mathbf{Grp}$ the left adjoint functor sending every monoid to the Grothendieck group of that monoid. The forgetful functor $\mathrm{U}:\mathbf{Grp}\to\mathbf{Set}$ has a left adjoint given by the composite $\mathrm{KF}:\mathbf{Set}\to\mathbf{Mon}\to\mathbf{Grp}$, where $\mathrm{F}$ is the free functor; this functor assigns to every set $S$ the free group on $S$.

== Categorical properties ==
The monomorphisms in $\mathbf{Grp}$ are precisely the injective homomorphisms, the epimorphisms are precisely the surjective homomorphisms, and the isomorphisms are precisely the bijective homomorphisms.

The category $\mathbf{Grp}$ is both complete and co-complete. The category-theoretical product in $\mathbf{Grp}$ is just the direct product of groups while the category-theoretical coproduct in $\mathbf{Grp}$ is the free product of groups. The zero objects in $\mathbf{Grp}$ are the trivial groups (consisting of just an identity element).

Every morphism $f:G\to H$ in $\mathbf{Grp}$ has a category-theoretic kernel (given by the ordinary kernel of algebra $\operatorname{ker}f=\{x\in G|f(x)=e\}$), and also a category-theoretic cokernel (given by the quotient group of $H$ by the normal closure of $f(G)$ in $H$). Unlike in abelian categories, it is not true that every monomorphism in $\mathbf{Grp}$ is the kernel of its cokernel.

=== Not additive and therefore not abelian ===
The category of abelian groups, $\mathbf{Ab}$, is a full subcategory of $\mathbf{Grp}$. $\mathbf{Ab}$ is an abelian category, but $\mathbf{Grp}$ is not. Indeed, $\mathbf{Grp}$ isn't even an additive category, because there is no natural way to define the "sum" of two group homomorphisms. A proof of this is as follows: The set of morphisms from the symmetric group $S_3$ of order three to itself, $E=\operatorname{Hom}(S_3,S_3)$, has ten elements: an element $z$ whose product on either side with every element of $E$ is $z$ (the homomorphism sending every element to the identity), three elements such that their product on one fixed side is always itself (the projections onto the three subgroups of order two), and six automorphisms. If $\mathbf{Grp}$ were an additive category, then this set $E$ of ten elements would be a ring. In any ring, the zero element is singled out by the property that $0x=x0=0$ for all $x$ in the ring, and so $z$ would have to be the zero of $E$. However, there are no two nonzero elements of $E$ whose product is $z$, so this finite ring would have no zero divisors. A finite ring with no zero divisors is a field by Wedderburn's little theorem, but there is no field with ten elements because every finite field has for its order, the power of a prime.

=== Exact sequences ===
The notion of exact sequence is meaningful in $\mathbf{Grp}$, and some results from the theory of abelian categories, such as the nine lemma, the five lemma, and their consequences hold true in $\mathbf{Grp}$. The snake lemma however is not true in $\mathbf{Grp}$.

$\mathbf{Grp}$ is a regular category.
