= Generalized linear array model =

In statistics, the generalized linear array model (GLAM) is used for analyzing data sets with array structures. It based on the generalized linear model with the design matrix written as a Kronecker product.

== Overview ==
The generalized linear array model or GLAM was introduced in 2006. Such models provide a structure and a computational procedure for fitting generalized linear models or GLMs whose model matrix can be written as a Kronecker product and whose data can be written as an array. In a large GLM, the GLAM approach gives very substantial savings in both storage and computational time over the usual GLM algorithm.

Suppose that the data $\mathbf Y$ is arranged in a $d$-dimensional array with size $n_1\times n_2\times\dots\times n_d$; thus, the corresponding data vector $\mathbf y = \operatorname{vec}(\mathbf Y)$ has size $n_1n_2n_3\cdots n_d$. Suppose also that the design matrix is of the form

$$\mathbf X = \mathbf X_d\otimes\mathbf X_{d-1}\otimes\dots\otimes\mathbf X_1.$$

The standard analysis of a GLM with data vector $\mathbf y$ and design matrix $\mathbf X$ proceeds by repeated evaluation of the scoring algorithm

$$\mathbf X'\tilde{\mathbf W}_\delta\mathbf X\hat{\boldsymbol\theta} = \mathbf X'\tilde{\mathbf W}_\delta\tilde{\boldsymbol\theta} ,$$

where $\tilde{\boldsymbol\theta}$ represents the approximate solution of $\boldsymbol\theta$, and $\hat{\boldsymbol\theta}$ is the improved value of it; $\mathbf W_\delta$ is the diagonal weight matrix with elements

$$w_{ii}^{-1} = \left(\frac{\partial\eta_i}{\partial\mu_i}\right)^2\mathrm{var}(y_i),$$

and

$$\mathbf z = \boldsymbol\eta + \mathbf W_\delta^{-1}(\mathbf y - \boldsymbol\mu)$$

is the working variable.

Computationally, GLAM provides array algorithms to calculate the linear predictor,

$$\boldsymbol\eta = \mathbf X \boldsymbol\theta$$

and the weighted inner product

$$\mathbf X'\tilde{\mathbf W}_\delta\mathbf X$$

without evaluation of the model matrix $\mathbf X .$

=== Example ===
In 2 dimensions, let $\mathbf X = \mathbf X_2\otimes\mathbf X_1$, then the linear predictor is written $\mathbf X_1 \boldsymbol\Theta \mathbf X_2'$ where $\boldsymbol\Theta$ is the matrix of coefficients; the weighted inner product is obtained from $G(\mathbf X_1)' \mathbf W G(\mathbf X_2)$ and $\mathbf W$ is the matrix of weights; here $G(\mathbf M)$ is the row tensor function of the $r \times c$ matrix $\mathbf M$ given by

$$G(\mathbf M) = (\mathbf M \otimes \mathbf 1') \circ (\mathbf 1' \otimes \mathbf M)$$

where $\circ$ means element by element multiplication and $\mathbf 1$ is a vector of 1's of length $c$.

On the other hand, the row tensor function $G(\mathbf M)$ of the $r \times c$ matrix $\mathbf M$ is the example of Face-splitting product of matrices, which was proposed by Vadym Slyusar in 1996:

$$\mathbf{M} \bull \mathbf{M} = \left(\mathbf {M} \otimes \mathbf {1}^\textsf{T}\right) \circ \left(\mathbf {1}^\textsf{T} \otimes \mathbf {M}\right) ,$$

where $\bull$ means Face-splitting product.

These low storage high speed formulae extend to $d$-dimensions.

== Applications ==
GLAM is designed to be used in $d$-dimensional smoothing problems where the data are arranged in an array and the smoothing matrix is constructed as a Kronecker product of $d$ one-dimensional smoothing matrices.
