= Khatri–Rao product =

Type of product of matrices

In mathematics, the Khatri–Rao product or block Kronecker product of two partitioned matrices $\mathbf{A}$ and $\mathbf{B}$ is defined as

$$\mathbf{A} \ast \mathbf{B} = \left(\mathbf{A}_{ij} \otimes \mathbf{B}_{ij}\right)_{ij}$$

in which the ij-th block is the m_{i}p_{i} × n_{j}q_{j} sized Kronecker product of the corresponding blocks of A and B, assuming the number of row and column partitions of both matrices is equal. The size of the product is then (Σ_{i} m_{i}p_{i}) × (Σ_{j} n_{j}q_{j}).

For example, if A and B both are 2 × 2 partitioned matrices e.g.:

$$\mathbf{A} =
\left[
\begin{array} {c | c}
\mathbf{A}_{11} & \mathbf{A}_{12} \\
\hline
\mathbf{A}_{21} & \mathbf{A}_{22}
\end{array}
\right]
=
\left[
\begin{array} {c c | c}
1 & 2 & 3 \\
4 & 5 & 6 \\
\hline
7 & 8 & 9
\end{array}
\right]
,\quad
\mathbf{B} =
\left[
\begin{array} {c | c}
\mathbf{B}_{11} & \mathbf{B}_{12} \\
\hline
\mathbf{B}_{21} & \mathbf{B}_{22}
\end{array}
\right]
=
\left[
\begin{array} {c | c c}
1 & 4 & 7 \\
\hline
2 & 5 & 8 \\
3 & 6 & 9
\end{array}
\right]
,$$

we obtain:

$$\mathbf{A} \ast \mathbf{B} =
\left[
\begin{array} {c | c}
\mathbf{A}_{11} \otimes \mathbf{B}_{11} & \mathbf{A}_{12} \otimes \mathbf{B}_{12} \\
\hline
\mathbf{A}_{21} \otimes \mathbf{B}_{21} & \mathbf{A}_{22} \otimes \mathbf{B}_{22}
\end{array}
\right]
=
\left[
\begin{array} {c c | c c}
1 & 2 & 12 & 21 \\
4 & 5 & 24 & 42 \\
\hline
14 & 16 & 45 & 72 \\
21 & 24 & 54 & 81
\end{array}
\right].$$

This is a submatrix of the Tracy–Singh product of the two matrices (each partition in this example is a partition in a corner of the Tracy–Singh product).

== Column-wise Kronecker product ==
The column-wise Kronecker product of two matrices is a special case of the Khatri-Rao product as defined above, and may also be called the Khatri–Rao product. This product assumes the partitions of the matrices are their columns. In this case m_{1} = m, p_{1} = p, n = q and for each j: n_{j} = q_{j} = 1. The resulting product is a mp × n matrix of which each column is the Kronecker product of the corresponding columns of A and B. Using the matrices from the previous examples with the columns partitioned:

$$\mathbf{C} =
\left[
\begin{array} { c | c | c}
\mathbf{C}_1 & \mathbf{C}_2 & \mathbf{C}_3
\end{array}
\right]
=
\left[
\begin{array} {c | c | c}
1 & 2 & 3 \\
4 & 5 & 6 \\
7 & 8 & 9
\end{array}
\right]
,\quad
\mathbf{D} =
\left[
\begin{array} { c | c | c }
\mathbf{D}_1 & \mathbf{D}_2 & \mathbf{D}_3
\end{array}
\right]
=
\left[
\begin{array} { c | c | c }
1 & 4 & 7 \\
2 & 5 & 8 \\
3 & 6 & 9
\end{array}
\right]
,$$

so that:

$$\mathbf{C} \ast \mathbf{D}
=
\left[
\begin{array} { c | c | c }
\mathbf{C}_1 \otimes \mathbf{D}_1 & \mathbf{C}_2 \otimes \mathbf{D}_2 & \mathbf{C}_3 \otimes \mathbf{D}_3
\end{array}
\right]
=
\left[
\begin{array} { c | c | c }
1 & 8 & 21 \\
2 & 10 & 24 \\
3 & 12 & 27 \\
4 & 20 & 42 \\
8 & 25 & 48 \\
12 & 30 & 54 \\
7 & 32 & 63 \\
14 & 40 & 72 \\
21 & 48 & 81
\end{array}
\right].$$

This column-wise version of the Khatri–Rao product is useful in linear algebra approaches to data analytical processing and in optimizing the solution of inverse problems dealing with a diagonal matrix.

In 1996 the column-wise Khatri–Rao product was proposed to estimate the angles of arrival (AOAs) and delays of multipath signals and four coordinates of signals sources at a digital antenna array.

== Face-splitting product ==
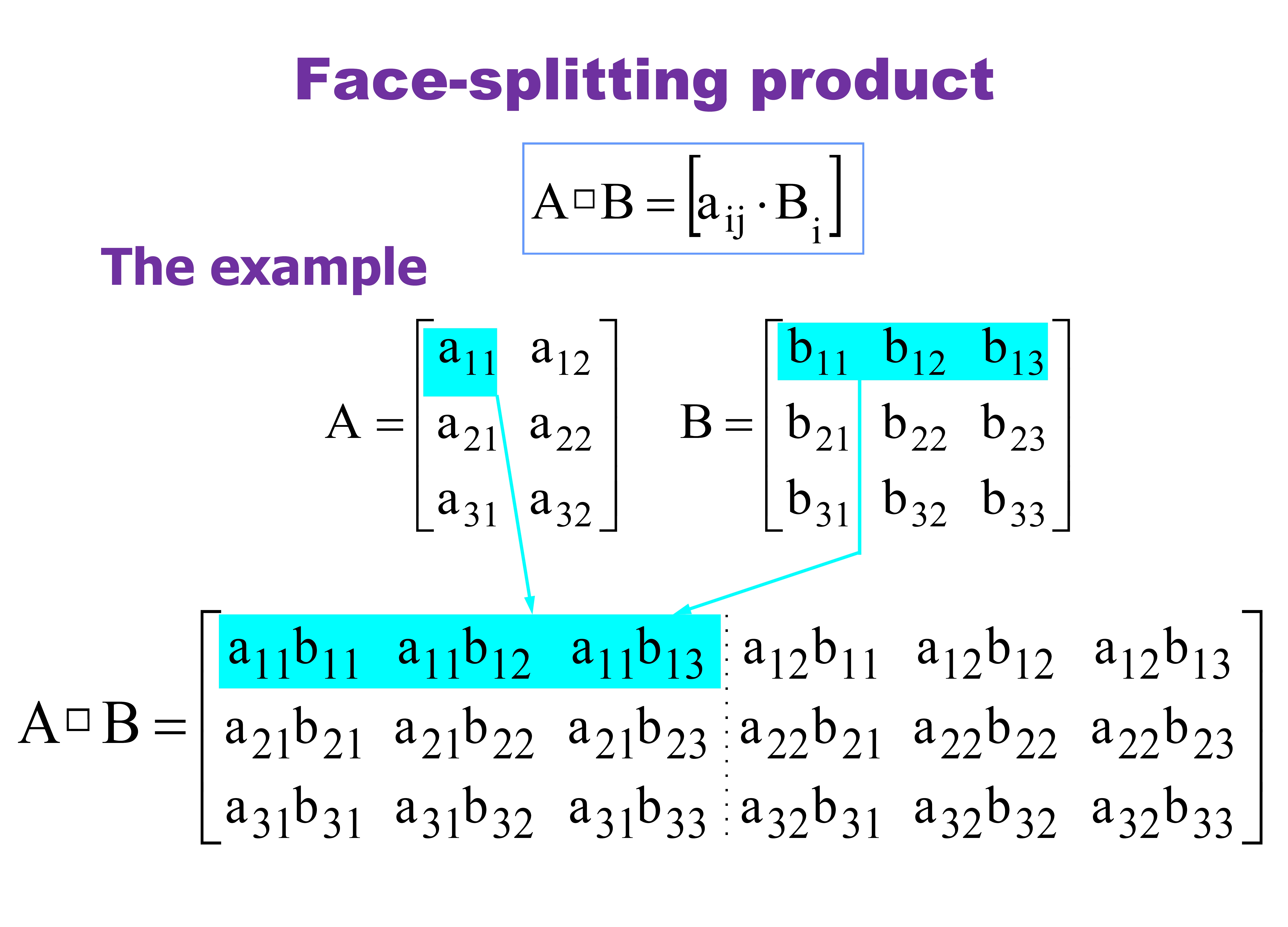
Face splitting product of matrices

An alternative concept of the matrix product, which uses row-wise splitting of matrices with a given quantity of rows, was proposed by V. Slyusar in 1996.

This matrix operation was named the "face-splitting product" of matrices or the "transposed Khatri–Rao product". This type of operation is based on row-by-row Kronecker products of two matrices. Using the matrices from the previous examples with the rows partitioned:

$$\mathbf{C} =
\begin{bmatrix}
\mathbf{C}_1 \\\hline
\mathbf{C}_2 \\\hline
\mathbf{C}_3\\
\end{bmatrix}
=
\begin{bmatrix}
1 & 2 & 3 \\\hline
4 & 5 & 6 \\\hline
7 & 8 & 9
\end{bmatrix}
,\quad
\mathbf{D} =
\begin{bmatrix}
\mathbf{D}_1\\\hline
\mathbf{D}_2\\\hline
\mathbf{D}_3\\
\end{bmatrix}
=
\begin{bmatrix}
1 & 4 & 7 \\\hline
2 & 5 & 8 \\\hline
3 & 6 & 9
\end{bmatrix}
,$$

the result can be obtained:

$$\mathbf{C} \bull \mathbf{D}
=
\begin{bmatrix}
\mathbf{C}_1 \otimes \mathbf{D}_1\\\hline
\mathbf{C}_2 \otimes \mathbf{D}_2\\\hline
\mathbf{C}_3 \otimes \mathbf{D}_3\\
\end{bmatrix}
=
\begin{bmatrix}
1 & 4 & 7 & 2 & 8 & 14 & 3 & 12 & 21 \\\hline
8 & 20 & 32 & 10 & 25 & 40 & 12 & 30 & 48 \\\hline
21 & 42 & 63 & 24 & 48 & 72 & 27 & 54 & 81
\end{bmatrix}.$$

== Main properties ==
In the following properties, the operator $\bull$ denotes the row-wise Kronecker product (face-splitting product) and the operator $\ast$ denotes the column-wise Kronecker product

1. Transpose (V. Slyusar, 1996):
  $$\left(\mathbf{A} \bull \mathbf{B}\right)^\textsf{T} = \textbf{A}^\textsf{T} \ast \mathbf{B}^\textsf{T}$$,
2. Bilinearity and associativity:
  $$\begin{align}
\mathbf{A} \bull (\mathbf{B} + \mathbf{C}) &= \mathbf{A} \bull \mathbf{B} + \mathbf{A} \bull \mathbf{C}, \\
(\mathbf{B} + \mathbf{C}) \bull \mathbf{A} &= \mathbf{B} \bull \mathbf{A} + \mathbf{C} \bull \mathbf{A}, \\
(k\mathbf{A}) \bull \mathbf{B} &= \mathbf{A} \bull (k\mathbf{B}) = k(\mathbf{A} \bull \mathbf{B}), \\
(\mathbf{A} \bull \mathbf{B}) \bull \mathbf{C} &= \mathbf{A} \bull (\mathbf{B} \bull \mathbf{C}), \\
\end{align}$$
  where A, B and C are matrices, and k is a scalar,
  $a \bull \mathbf{B} = \mathbf{B} \bull a$,
  where $a$ is a vector,
3. The mixed-product property (V. Slyusar, 1997):
  $$(\mathbf{A} \bull \mathbf{B})\left(\mathbf{A}^\textsf{T} \ast \mathbf{B}^\textsf{T}\right) = \left(\mathbf{A}\mathbf{A}^\textsf{T}\right) \circ \left(\mathbf{B}\mathbf{B}^\textsf{T}\right)$$,
  $(\mathbf{A} \bull \mathbf{B})(\mathbf{C} \ast \mathbf{D}) = (\mathbf{A}\mathbf{C}) \circ (\mathbf{B} \mathbf{D})$,
  $(\mathbf{A} \bull \mathbf{B} \bull \mathbf{C} \bull \mathbf{D})(\mathbf{L} \ast \mathbf{M} \ast \mathbf{N} \ast \mathbf{P}) = (\mathbf{A}\mathbf{L}) \circ (\mathbf{B} \mathbf{M}) \circ (\mathbf{C} \mathbf{N})\circ (\mathbf{D} \mathbf{P})$
  $(\mathbf{A} \ast \mathbf{B})^\textsf{T}(\mathbf{A} \ast \mathbf{B}) = \left(\mathbf{A}^\textsf{T}\mathbf{A}\right) \circ \left(\mathbf{B}^\textsf{T} \mathbf{B}\right)$,
  where $\circ$ denotes the Hadamard product,
4. $(\mathbf{A} \circ \mathbf{B}) \bull (\mathbf{C} \circ \mathbf{D}) = (\mathbf{A} \bull \mathbf{C}) \circ (\mathbf{B} \bull \mathbf{D})$,
5. $\ a \otimes (\mathbf{B} \bull \mathbf{C}) = (a \otimes \mathbf{B}) \bull \mathbf{C}$, where $a$ is a row vector,
6. $(\mathbf{A} \otimes \mathbf{B})(\mathbf{C} \ast \mathbf{D}) = (\mathbf{A}\mathbf{C}) \ast (\mathbf{B} \mathbf{D})$,
7. $(\mathbf{A} \otimes \mathbf{B}) \ast (\mathbf{C} \otimes \mathbf{D}) = \mathbf{P}[ (\mathbf{A} \ast \mathbf{C}) \otimes (\mathbf{B} \ast \mathbf{D})]$, where $\mathbf{P}$ is a permutation matrix.
8. $(\mathbf{A} \bull \mathbf{B})(\mathbf{C} \otimes \mathbf{D}) = (\mathbf{A}\mathbf{C}) \bull (\mathbf{B} \mathbf{D})$,
  Similarly:
  $$(\mathbf{A} \bull \mathbf{L})(\mathbf{B} \otimes \mathbf{M}) \cdots (\mathbf{C} \otimes \mathbf{S}) = (\mathbf{A}\mathbf{B}\cdots\mathbf{C}) \bull (\mathbf{L}\mathbf{M}\cdots\mathbf{S})$$,
9. $c^\textsf{T} \bull d^\textsf{T} = c^\textsf{T} \otimes d^\textsf{T}$,
  $$c \ast d = c \otimes d$$,
  where $c$ and $d$ are vectors,
10. $\left(\mathbf{A} \ast c^\textsf{T}\right)d = \left(\mathbf{A} \ast d^\textsf{T}\right)c$, $d^\textsf{T}\left(c \bull \mathbf{A}^\textsf{T}\right) = c^\textsf{T}\left(d \bull \mathbf{A}^\textsf{T}\right)$,
11. $(\mathbf{A} \bull \mathbf{B})(c \otimes d) = (\mathbf{A}c) \circ (\mathbf{B}d)$,
  where $c$ and $d$ are vectors (it is a combine of properties 3 an 8),
  Similarly:
  $$(\mathbf{A} \bull \mathbf{B})(\mathbf{M}\mathbf{N}c \otimes \mathbf{Q}\mathbf{P}d) = (\mathbf{A}\mathbf{M}\mathbf{N}c) \circ (\mathbf{B}\mathbf{Q}\mathbf{P}d),$$
12. $$\mathcal F\left((C^{(1)}x) \star (C^{(2)}y)\right) = \left((\mathcal F C^{(1)}) \bull (\mathcal F C^{(2)})\right)(x \otimes y) = (\mathcal F C^{(1)}x) \circ (\mathcal F C^{(2)}y)$$,
  where $\star$ is vector convolution; $C^{(1)},C^{(2)}$ are "count sketch" matrices; and $\mathcal F$ is the Fourier transform matrix (this result is an evolving of count sketch properties).
  This can be generalized for appropriate matrices $\mathbf{A},\mathbf{B}$:
  $$\mathcal F\left((\mathbf{A}x) \star (\mathbf{B}y)\right) = \left((\mathcal F \mathbf{A}) \bull (\mathcal F \mathbf{B})\right)(x \otimes y) = (\mathcal F \mathbf{A}x) \circ (\mathcal F \mathbf{B}y)$$
  because property 11 above gives us
  $$\left((\mathcal F \mathbf{A}) \bull (\mathcal F \mathbf{B})\right)(x \otimes y) = (\mathcal F \mathbf{A}x) \circ (\mathcal F \mathbf{B}y)$$
  And the convolution theorem gives us
  $$\mathcal F\left((\mathbf{A}x) \star (\mathbf{B}y)\right) = (\mathcal F \mathbf{A}x) \circ (\mathcal F \mathbf{B}y)$$
13. $\mathbf{A} \bull \mathbf{B} = \left(\mathbf {A} \otimes \mathbf {1_k}^\textsf{T}\right) \circ \left(\mathbf {1_c}^\textsf{T} \otimes \mathbf {B}\right)$,
  where $\mathbf {A}$ is $r \times c$ matrix, $\mathbf{B}$ is $r \times k$ matrix, $\mathbf{1_c}$ is a vector of 1's of length $c$, and $\mathbf{1_k}$ is a vector of 1's of length $k$
  or
  $\mathbf{M} \bull \mathbf{M} = \left(\mathbf{M} \otimes \mathbf{1}^\textsf{T}\right) \circ \left(\mathbf{1}^\textsf{T} \otimes \mathbf{M}\right)$,
  where $\mathbf{M}$ is $r \times c$ matrix, $\circ$ means element by element multiplication and $\mathbf{1}$ is a vector of 1's of length $c$.
  $$\mathbf{M} \bull \mathbf{M} = \mathbf{M} [\circ] \left(\mathbf{M} \otimes \mathbf{1}^\textsf{T}\right)$$,
  where $[\circ]$ denotes the penetrating face product of matrices.
  Similarly:
  $\mathbf{P} \ast \mathbf{N} = (\mathbf{P} \otimes \mathbf{1_k}) \circ (\mathbf{1_c} \otimes \mathbf{N})$, where $\mathbf{P}$ is $c \times r$ matrix, $\mathbf{N}$ is $k \times r$ matrix,.
14. $\mathbf{W_d}\mathbf{A} = \mathbf{w} \bull \mathbf{A}$,
  $\operatorname{vec}((\mathbf{w}^\textsf{T} \ast \mathbf{A})\mathbf{B})= (\mathbf{B}^\textsf{T} \ast \mathbf{A}) \mathbf{w}$= $\operatorname{vec}(\mathbf{A}(\mathbf{w} \bull \mathbf{B}))$= $\operatorname{vec}(\mathbf{A}\mathbf{W_d}\mathbf{B})$,
  $\operatorname{vec}\left(\mathbf{A}^\textsf{T} \mathbf{W_d} \mathbf{A}\right) = \left(\mathbf{A} \bull \mathbf{A}\right)^\textsf{T} \mathbf{w}$,
  where $\mathbf{w}$ is the vector consisting of the diagonal elements of $\mathbf{W_d}$, $\operatorname{vec}(\mathbf{A})$ means stack the columns of a matrix $\mathbf{A}$ on top of each other to give a vector.
15. $(\mathbf{A} \bull \mathbf{L})(\mathbf{B} \otimes \mathbf{M}) \cdots (\mathbf{C} \otimes \mathbf{S})(\mathbf{K} \ast \mathbf{T}) = (\mathbf{A}\mathbf{B}...\mathbf{C}\mathbf{K}) \circ (\mathbf{L}\mathbf{M}...\mathbf{S}\mathbf{T})$.
  Similarly:
  $$\begin{align}
(\mathbf{A} \bull \mathbf{L})(\mathbf{B} \otimes \mathbf{M}) \cdots (\mathbf{C} \otimes \mathbf{S})(c \otimes d)
&= (\mathbf{A}\mathbf{B} \cdots \mathbf{C}c) \circ (\mathbf{L}\mathbf{M} \cdots \mathbf{S}d), \\
(\mathbf{A} \bull \mathbf{L})(\mathbf{B} \otimes \mathbf{M}) \cdots (\mathbf{C} \otimes \mathbf{S})(\mathbf{P}c \otimes \mathbf{Q}d)
&= (\mathbf{A}\mathbf{B} \cdots \mathbf{C}\mathbf{P}c) \circ (\mathbf{L}\mathbf{M}\cdots\mathbf{S}\mathbf{Q}d)
\end{align}$$,
  where $c$ and $d$ are vectors
16. If $\mathbf{B}$ is a diagonal matrix and $\mathbf{b}$ is its main diagonal:
  $$\operatorname{vec}(\mathbf{A} \mathbf{B} \mathbf{C})
=
( \mathbf{C}^\mathrm T \ast \mathbf{A} ) \mathbf{b}$$
  Here, $\operatorname{vec}(\cdot)$ is the column-wise vectorization operator.

=== Examples ===
$$\begin{align}
&\left(
\begin{bmatrix}
1 & 0 \\
0 & 1 \\
1 & 0
\end{bmatrix}
\bullet
\begin{bmatrix}
1 & 0 \\
1 & 0 \\
0 & 1
\end{bmatrix}
\right)
\left(
\begin{bmatrix}
1 & 1 \\
1 & -1
\end{bmatrix}
\otimes
\begin{bmatrix}
1 & 1 \\
1 & -1
\end{bmatrix}
\right)
\left(
\begin{bmatrix}
\sigma_1 & 0 \\
0 & \sigma_2 \\
\end{bmatrix}
\otimes
\begin{bmatrix}
\rho_1 & 0 \\
0 & \rho_2 \\
\end{bmatrix}
\right)
\left(
\begin{bmatrix}
x_1 \\
x_2
\end{bmatrix}
\ast
\begin{bmatrix}
y_1 \\
y_2
\end{bmatrix}
\right)
\\[5pt]
{}={} &\left(
\begin{bmatrix}
1 & 0 \\
0 & 1 \\
1 & 0
\end{bmatrix}
\bullet
\begin{bmatrix}
1 & 0 \\
1 & 0 \\
0 & 1
\end{bmatrix}
\right)
\left(
\begin{bmatrix}
1 & 1 \\
1 & -1
\end{bmatrix}
\begin{bmatrix}
\sigma_1 & 0 \\
0 & \sigma_2 \\
\end{bmatrix}
\begin{bmatrix}
x_1 \\
x_2
\end{bmatrix}
\,\otimes\,
\begin{bmatrix}
1 & 1 \\
1 & -1
\end{bmatrix}
\begin{bmatrix}
\rho_1 & 0 \\
0 & \rho_2 \\
\end{bmatrix}
\begin{bmatrix}
y_1 \\
y_2
\end{bmatrix}
\right)
\\[5pt]
{}={} &
\begin{bmatrix}
1 & 0 \\
0 & 1 \\
1 & 0
\end{bmatrix}
\begin{bmatrix}
1 & 1 \\
1 & -1
\end{bmatrix}
\begin{bmatrix}
\sigma_1 & 0 \\
0 & \sigma_2 \\
\end{bmatrix}
\begin{bmatrix}
x_1 \\
x_2
\end{bmatrix}
\,\circ\,
\begin{bmatrix}
1 & 0 \\
1 & 0 \\
0 & 1
\end{bmatrix}
\begin{bmatrix}
1 & 1 \\
1 & -1
\end{bmatrix}
\begin{bmatrix}
\rho_1 & 0 \\
0 & \rho_2 \\
\end{bmatrix}
\begin{bmatrix}
y_1 \\
y_2
\end{bmatrix}
.
\end{align}$$

=== Theorem ===
If $M = T^{(1)} \bullet \dots \bullet T^{(c)}$, where $T^{(1)}, \dots, T^{(c)}$ are independent components a random matrix $T$ with independent identically distributed rows $T_1, \dots, T_m\in \mathbb R^d$, such that

$E\left[(T_1x)^2\right] = \left\|x\right\|_2^2$ and $E\left[(T_1 x)^p\right]^\frac{1}{p} \le \sqrt{ap}\|x\|_2$,

then for any vector $x$

$$\left| \left\|Mx\right\|_2 - \left\|x\right\|_2 \right| < \varepsilon \left\|x\right\|_2$$

with probability $1 - \delta$ if the quantity of rows

$$m = (4a)^{2c} \varepsilon^{-2} \log 1/\delta + (2ae)\varepsilon^{-1}(\log 1/\delta)^c.$$

In particular, if the entries of $T$ are $\pm 1$ can get

$$m = O\left(\varepsilon^{-2}\log1/\delta + \varepsilon^{-1}\left(\frac{1}{c}\log1/\delta\right)^c\right)$$

which matches the Johnson–Lindenstrauss lemma of $m = O\left(\varepsilon^{-2}\log1/\delta\right)$ when $\varepsilon$ is small.

== Block face-splitting product ==
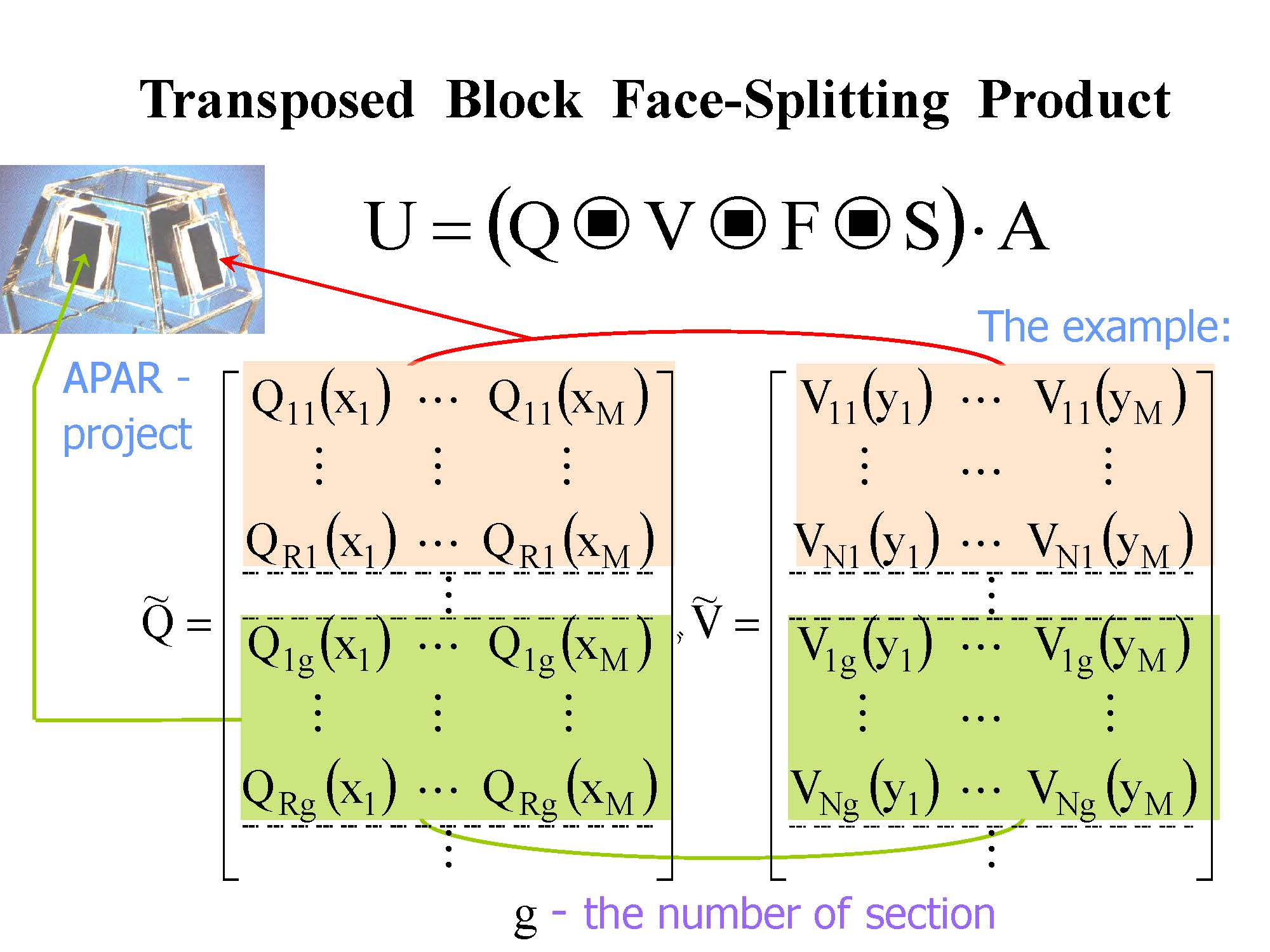
Transposed block face-splitting product in the context of a multi-face radar model

According to the definition of V. Slyusar the block face-splitting product of two partitioned matrices with a given quantity of rows in blocks

$$\mathbf{A} =
\left[
\begin{array} {c | c}
\mathbf{A}_{11} & \mathbf{A}_{12} \\
\hline
\mathbf{A}_{21} & \mathbf{A}_{22}
\end{array}
\right]
,\quad
\mathbf{B} =
\left[
\begin{array} {c | c}
\mathbf{B}_{11} & \mathbf{B}_{12} \\
\hline
\mathbf{B}_{21} & \mathbf{B}_{22}
\end{array}
\right]
,$$

can be written as :

$$\mathbf{A} [\bull]  \mathbf{B} =
\left[
\begin{array} {c | c}
\mathbf{A}_{11} \bull \mathbf{B}_{11} & \mathbf{A}_{12} \bull \mathbf{B}_{12} \\
\hline
\mathbf{A}_{21} \bull \mathbf{B}_{21} & \mathbf{A}_{22} \bull \mathbf{B}_{22}
\end{array}
\right] .$$

The transposed block face-splitting product (or Block column-wise version of the Khatri–Rao product) of two partitioned matrices with a given quantity of columns in blocks has a view:

$$\mathbf{A} [\ast]  \mathbf{B} =
\left[
\begin{array} {c | c}
\mathbf{A}_{11} \ast \mathbf{B}_{11} & \mathbf{A}_{12} \ast \mathbf{B}_{12} \\
\hline
\mathbf{A}_{21} \ast \mathbf{B}_{21} & \mathbf{A}_{22} \ast \mathbf{B}_{22}
\end{array}
\right].$$

=== Main properties ===
1. Transpose:
  $\left(\mathbf{A} [\ast] \mathbf{B} \right)^\textsf{T} = \textbf{A}^\textsf{T} [\bull] \mathbf{B}^\textsf{T}$

== Applications ==
The Face-splitting product and the Block Face-splitting product used in the tensor-matrix theory of digital antenna arrays. These operations are also used in:

- Artificial Intelligence and Machine learning systems to minimization of convolution and tensor sketch operations,
- A popular Natural Language Processing models, and hypergraph models of similarity,
- Generalized linear array model in statistics
- Two- and multidimensional P-spline approximation of data,
- Studies of genotype x environment interactions.

== See also ==
- Kronecker product
- Hadamard product
