= Commutation matrix =

Matrix in linear algebra

In mathematics, especially in linear algebra and matrix theory, the commutation matrix is used for transforming the vectorized form of a matrix into the vectorized form of its transpose. Specifically, the commutation matrix K^{(m,n)} is the nm × mn permutation matrix which, for any m × n matrix A, transforms vec(A) into vec(A^{T}):

K^{(m,n)} vec(A) = vec(A^{T}) .

Here vec(A) is the mn × 1 column vector obtain by stacking the columns of A on top of one another:

$$\operatorname{vec}(\mathbf{A}) = [\mathbf{A}_{1,1}, \ldots, \mathbf{A}_{m,1}, \mathbf{A}_{1,2}, \ldots, \mathbf{A}_{m,2}, \ldots, \mathbf{A}_{1,n}, \ldots, \mathbf{A}_{m,n}]^{\mathrm{T}}$$

where A = [A_{i,j}]. In other words, vec(A) is the vector obtained by vectorizing A in column-major order. Similarly, vec(A^{T}) is the vector obtaining by vectorizing A in row-major order. The cycles and other properties of this permutation have been heavily studied for in-place matrix transposition algorithms.

In the context of quantum information theory, the commutation matrix is sometimes referred to as the swap matrix or swap operator

== Properties ==
- The commutation matrix is a special type of permutation matrix, and is therefore orthogonal. In particular, K^{(m,n)} is equal to $\mathbf P_\pi$, where $\pi$ is the permutation over $\{1,\dots,mn\}$ for which

$$\pi(i + m(j-1)) = j + n(i-1), \quad i = 1,\dots,m, \quad j = 1,\dots,n.$$

- The determinant of K^{(m,n)} is $(-1)^{\frac 14 n(n-1)m(m-1)}$.
- Replacing A with A^{T} in the definition of the commutation matrix shows that K^{(m,n)} = (K^{(n,m)})^{T}. Therefore, in the special case of m = n the commutation matrix is an involution and symmetric.
- The main use of the commutation matrix, and the source of its name, is to commute the Kronecker product: for every m × n matrix A and every r × q matrix B,

$$\mathbf{K}^{(r, m)} (\mathbf{A} \otimes \mathbf{B}) \mathbf{K}^{(n, q)} = \mathbf{B} \otimes \mathbf{A}.$$

This property is often used in developing the higher order statistics of Wishart covariance matrices.

- The case of n=q=1 for the above equation states that for any column vectors v,w of sizes m,r respectively,

$$\mathbf{K}^{(r,m)}(\mathbf v \otimes \mathbf w) = \mathbf w \otimes \mathbf v.$$

This property is the reason that this matrix is referred to as the "swap operator" in the context of quantum information theory.

- Two explicit forms for the commutation matrix are as follows: if e_{r,j} denotes the j-th canonical vector of dimension r (i.e. the vector with 1 in the j-th coordinate and 0 elsewhere) then

$$\mathbf{K}^{(r, m)} = \sum_{i=1}^r \sum_{j=1}^m \left(\mathbf{e}_{r,i} {\mathbf{e}_{m,j}}^{\mathrm{T}}\right) \otimes \left(\mathbf{e}_{m,j} {\mathbf{e}_{r,i}}^{\mathrm{T}}\right)
=
\sum_{i=1}^r \sum_{j=1}^m
\left(\mathbf{e}_{r,i} \otimes \mathbf{e}_{m,j}\right)
\left( \mathbf{e}_{m,j} \otimes \mathbf{e}_{r,i}\right)^{\mathrm{T}}
.$$

- The commutation matrix may be expressed as the following block matrix:

$$\mathbf{K}^{(m,n)} = \begin{bmatrix}
\mathbf{K}_{1,1} & \cdots & \mathbf{K}_{1,n}\\
\vdots & \ddots & \vdots\\
\mathbf{K}_{m,1} & \cdots & \mathbf{K}_{m,n},
\end{bmatrix},$$

Where the p,q entry of n x m block-matrix K_{i,j} is given by

$$\mathbf K_{ij}(p,q) = \begin{cases}
1 & i=q \text{ and } j = p,\\
0 & \text{otherwise}.
\end{cases}$$

For example,

$$\mathbf K^{(3,4)} =
\left[\begin{array}{ccc|ccc|ccc|ccc}
1 & 0 & 0 & 0 & 0 & 0 & 0 & 0 & 0 & 0 & 0 & 0\\
0 & 0 & 0 & 1 & 0 & 0 & 0 & 0 & 0 & 0 & 0 & 0\\
0 & 0 & 0 & 0 & 0 & 0 & 1 & 0 & 0 & 0 & 0 & 0\\
0 & 0 & 0 & 0 & 0 & 0 & 0 & 0 & 0 & 1 & 0 & 0\\
\hline
0 & 1 & 0 & 0 & 0 & 0 & 0 & 0 & 0 & 0 & 0 & 0\\
0 & 0 & 0 & 0 & 1 & 0 & 0 & 0 & 0 & 0 & 0 & 0\\
0 & 0 & 0 & 0 & 0 & 0 & 0 & 1 & 0 & 0 & 0 & 0\\
0 & 0 & 0 & 0 & 0 & 0 & 0 & 0 & 0 & 0 & 1 & 0\\
\hline
0 & 0 & 1 & 0 & 0 & 0 & 0 & 0 & 0 & 0 & 0 & 0\\
0 & 0 & 0 & 0 & 0 & 1 & 0 & 0 & 0 & 0 & 0 & 0\\
0 & 0 & 0 & 0 & 0 & 0 & 0 & 0 & 1 & 0 & 0 & 0\\
0 & 0 & 0 & 0 & 0 & 0 & 0 & 0 & 0 & 0 & 0 & 1\end{array}\right].$$

== Code ==
For both square and rectangular matrices of m rows and n columns, the commutation matrix can be generated by the code below.

=== Python ===
import numpy as np

def comm_mat(m, n):
    # determine permutation applied by K
    w = np.arange(m * n).reshape((m, n), order="F").T.ravel(order="F")

    # apply this permutation to the rows (i.e. to each column) of identity matrix and return result
    return np.eye(m * n)[w, :]

Alternatively, a version without imports:

# Kronecker delta
def delta(i, j):
    return int(i == j)

def comm_mat(m, n):
    # determine permutation applied by K
    v = [m * j + i for i in range(m) for j in range(n)]

    # apply this permutation to the rows (i.e. to each column) of identity matrix
    I = [[delta(i, j) for j in range(m * n)] for i in range(m * n)]
    return [I[i] for i in v]

=== MATLAB ===
function P = com_mat(m, n)

% determine permutation applied by K
A = reshape(1:m*n, m, n);
v = reshape(A', 1, []);

% apply this permutation to the rows (i.e. to each column) of identity matrix
P = eye(m*n);
P = P(v,:);

=== R ===
# Sparse matrix version
comm_mat = function(m, n){
  i = 1:(m * n)
  j = NULL
  for (k in 1:m) {
    j = c(j, m * 0:(n-1) + k)
  }
  Matrix::sparseMatrix(
    i = i, j = j, x = 1
  )
}

== Example ==
Let $A$ denote the following $3 \times 2$ matrix:

$$A =
\begin{bmatrix}
1 & 4  \\
2 & 5  \\
3 & 6  \\
\end{bmatrix}.$$

$A$ has the following column-major and row-major vectorizations (respectively):

$$\mathbf v_{\text{col}} = \operatorname{vec}(A) =
\begin{bmatrix}
1  \\
2  \\
3  \\
4  \\
5  \\
6  \\
\end{bmatrix}
, \quad  \mathbf v_{\text{row}} = \operatorname{vec}(A^{\mathrm T}) =
\begin{bmatrix}
1  \\
4  \\
2  \\
5  \\
3  \\
6  \\
\end{bmatrix}.$$

The associated commutation matrix is

$$K = \mathbf K^{(3,2)} = \begin{bmatrix}
1   & \cdot & \cdot & \cdot & \cdot & \cdot  \\
\cdot   & \cdot & \cdot &     1 & \cdot & \cdot  \\
\cdot   &     1 & \cdot & \cdot & \cdot  & \cdot  \\
\cdot   & \cdot & \cdot & \cdot &     1 & \cdot  \\
\cdot   & \cdot &     1 & \cdot & \cdot & \cdot  \\
\cdot   & \cdot & \cdot & \cdot & \cdot &     1  \\
\end{bmatrix},$$

(where each $\cdot$ denotes a zero). As expected, the following holds:

$$K^\mathrm{T}  K = KK^\mathrm{T} =\mathbf I_6$$
$$K \mathbf v_{\text{col}} = \mathbf v_{\text{row}}$$
