= Crystal system =

Classification of crystalline materials by their three-dimensional structural geometry

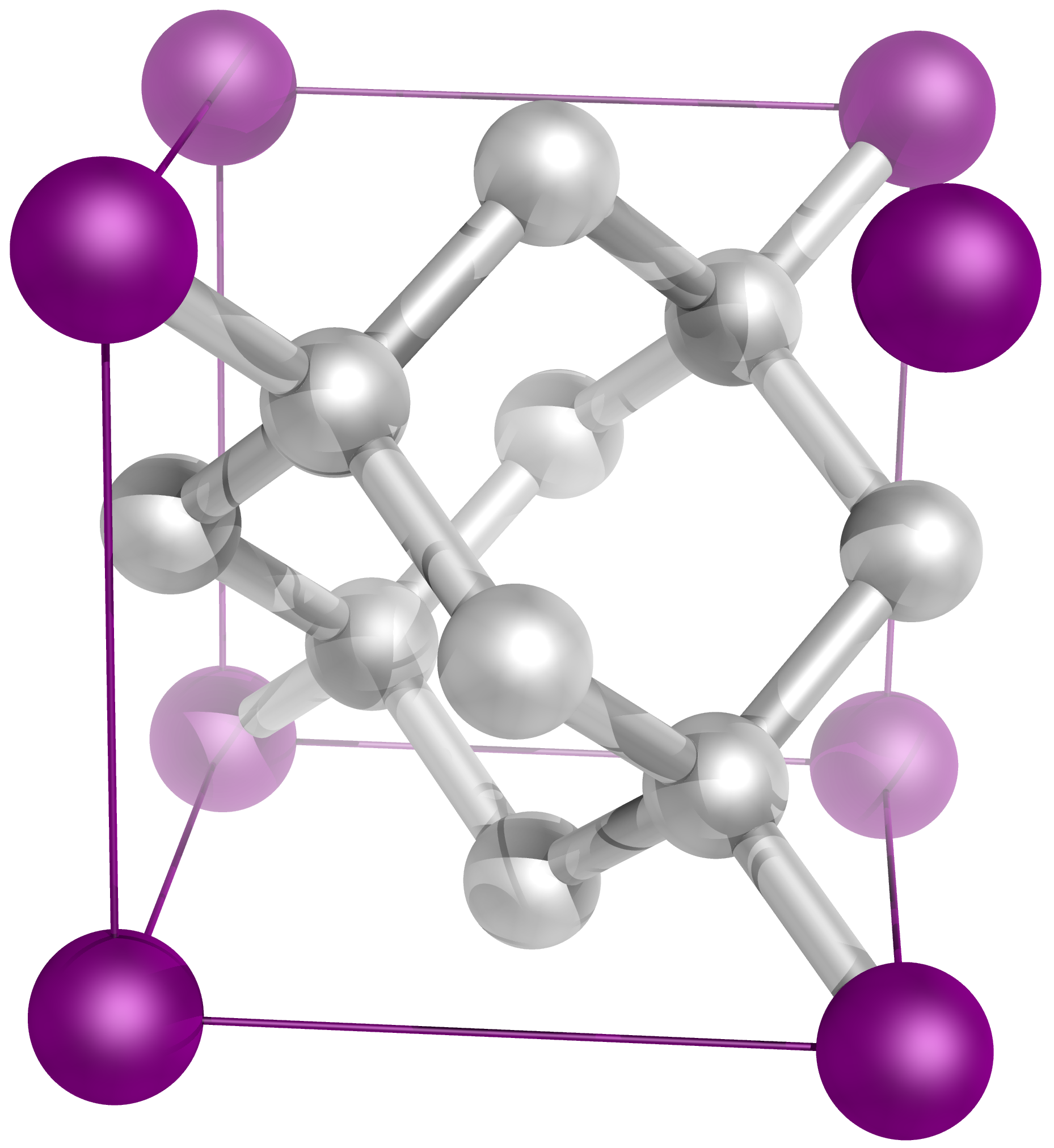
The diamond crystal structure belongs to the face-centered cubic lattice, with a repeated two-atom pattern.

In crystallography, a crystal system is a set of point groups (a group of geometric symmetries with at least one fixed point). A lattice system is a set of Bravais lattices (an infinite array of discrete points). Space groups (symmetry groups of a configuration in space) are classified into crystal systems according to their point groups, and into lattice systems according to their Bravais lattices. Crystal systems that have space groups assigned to a common lattice system are combined into a crystal family. Informally, two crystals are in the same crystal system if they have similar symmetries (though there are many exceptions).

== Overview ==
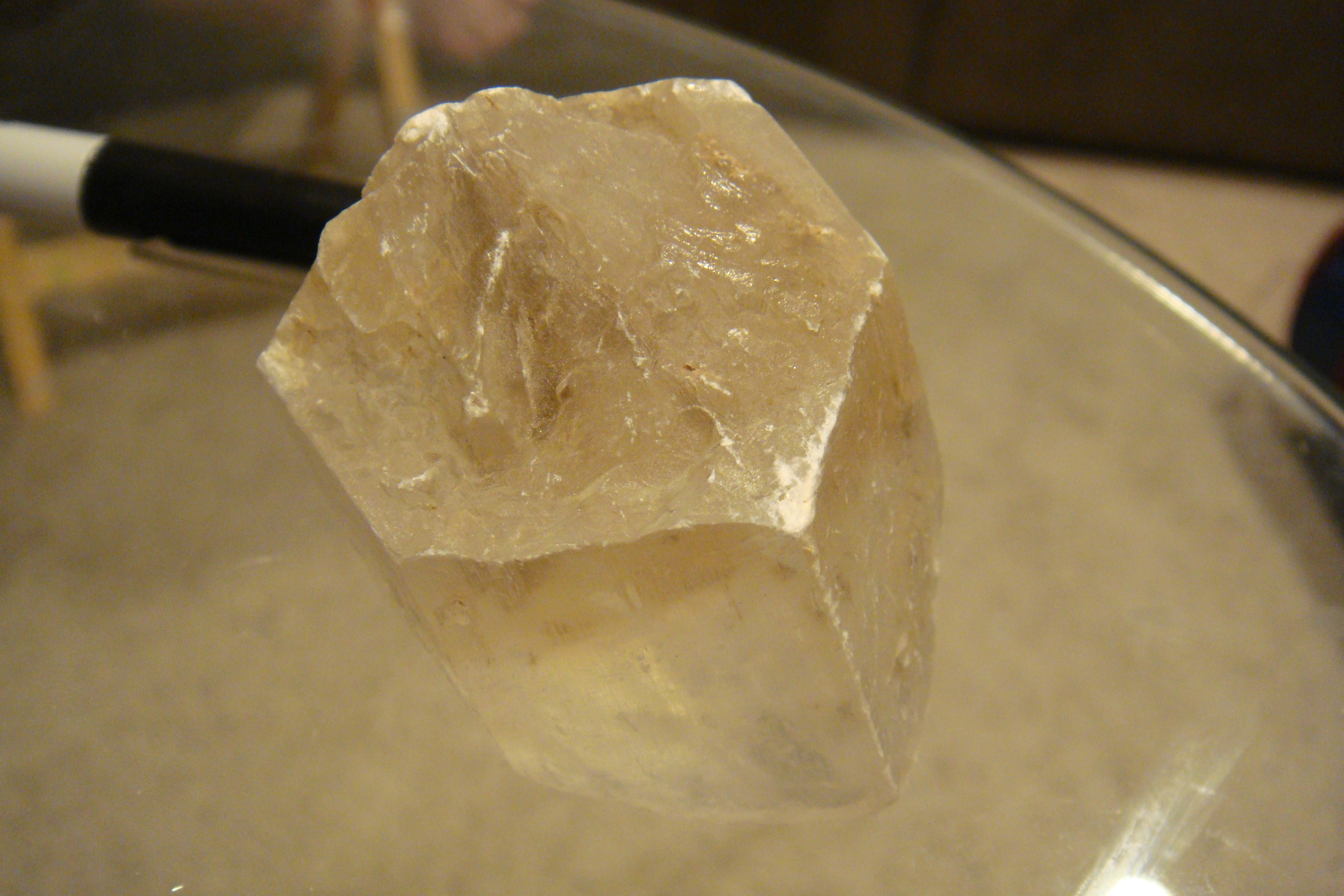
Hexagonal hanksite crystal, with threefold c-axis symmetry

Crystals can be classified in three ways: lattice systems, crystal systems and crystal families. The various classifications are often confused as the term "crystal system" is sometimes used to mean "lattice system" or "crystal family".

Crystal families
A crystal family is determined by lattices and point groups. It is formed by combining crystal systems that have space groups assigned to a common lattice system.
| Crystal systems | Lattice systems |
| A crystal system is a set of point groups in which the point groups themselves and their corresponding space groups are assigned to a lattice system. | A lattice system is a group of lattices with the same set of lattice point groups. |

== In 2 dimensions ==
In two-dimensional space, the crystal families, crystal systems, and lattice systems are the same. There are four crystal families (oblique, rectangular, square, and hexagonal).

| Crystal family | Point groups | Wallpaper groups | Bravais lattices |
|---|---|---|---|
| Oblique (monoclinic) | 1, 2 | 2 | mp |
| Rectangular (orthorhombic) | m, 2mm | 7 | op, oc |
| Square (tetragonal) | 4, 4mm | 3 | tp |
| Hexagonal | 3, 6, 3m, 6mm | 5 | hp |
| Total | 10 | 17 | 5 |

== In 3 dimensions ==
In three-dimensional space, there are 6 crystal families, 7 crystal systems and 7 lattice systems. Five of the crystal systems are essentially the same as five of the lattice systems: triclinic, monoclinic, orthorhombic, tetragonal, and cubic.

Of the 32 crystallographic point groups that exist in three dimensions, most are assigned to only one lattice system. However, 5 point groups have 7 corresponding space groups assigned to the rhombohedral lattice system and 18 corresponding space groups assigned to the hexagonal lattice system. These point groups are assigned to the trigonal crystal system.

The hexagonal and trigonal crystal systems differ from the hexagonal and rhombohedral lattice systems. These are combined into the hexagonal crystal family.

The relation between three-dimensional crystal families, crystal systems and lattice systems is shown in the following table:

| Crystal families | Point group classification | | Space groups | Lattice classification | |
| Crystal families | Crystal systems | Point groups | Space groups | Bravais lattices | Lattice systems |
|---|---|---|---|---|---|
| Triclinic | Triclinic | 2 | 2 | 1 | Triclinic |
| Monoclinic | Monoclinic | 3 | 13 | 2 | Monoclinic |
| Orthorhombic | Orthorhombic | 3 | 59 | 4 | Orthorhombic |
| Tetragonal | Tetragonal | 7 | 68 | 2 | Tetragonal |
| Hexagonal | Trigonal | 5 | 7 | 1 | Rhombohedral |
| Hexagonal | Trigonal | 5 | 18 | 1 | Hexagonal |
| Hexagonal | Hexagonal | 7 | 27 | 1 | Hexagonal |
| Cubic | Cubic | 5 | 36 | 3 | Cubic |
| Total | | 32 | 230 | 14 | Total |

Note: The trigonal crystal system is often confused with the rhombohedral lattice system. There is no "trigonal" lattice system. To avoid confusion of terminology, the term "trigonal lattice" is not used.

=== Crystal classes ===
The 7 crystal systems consist of 32 crystal classes (corresponding to the 32 crystallographic point groups) as shown in the following table below:

| Crystal family | Crystal system | Required symmetries | 32 crystal classes (Hermann-Mauguin) | | | | | | |
| Crystal family | Crystal system | Required symmetries | Primitive | Inverse | Central | Axial | Planar | Inverse-planar | Planar-axial |
|---|---|---|---|---|---|---|---|---|---|
| Triclinic | | None | 1 | 1̅ | | | | | |
| Monoclinic | | 1 twofold axis of rotation or 1 mirror plane | 2 | m | ^{2}/_{m} | | | | |
| Orthorhombic | | 3 twofold axes of rotation or 1 twofold axis of rotation and 2 mirror planes | | | | 222 | mm2 | | mmm |
| Tetragonal | | 1 fourfold axis of rotation | 4 | 4̅ | ^{4}/_{m} | 422 | 4mm | 4̅2m | 4/mmm |
| Hexagonal | Trigonal | 1 threefold axis of rotation | 3 | 3̅ | | 32 | 3m | 3̅m | |
| Hexagonal | Hexagonal | 1 sixfold axis of rotation | 6 | 6̅ | ^{6}/_{m} | 622 | 6mm | 6̅m2 | 6/mmm |
| Cubic | | 4 threefold axes of rotation | 23 | | m3̅ | 432 | | 4̅3m | m3̅m |

=== Bravais lattices ===
There are seven different kinds of lattice systems, and each kind of lattice system has four different kinds of centerings (primitive, base-centered, body-centered, face-centered). However, not all of the combinations are unique; some of the combinations are equivalent while other combinations are not possible due to symmetry reasons. This reduces the number of unique lattices to the 14 Bravais lattices.

The distribution of the 14 Bravais lattices into 7 lattice systems is given in the following table.

| Crystal family | Lattice system | Axial constraints | 14 Bravais lattices (Pearson symbol) | | | |
| Crystal family | Lattice system | Axial constraints | Primitive | Base-centered | Body-centered | Face-centered |
|---|---|---|---|---|---|---|
| Triclinic | | | aP | | | |
| Monoclinic | | α = γ = 90° | mP | mS | | |
| Orthorhombic | | α = β = γ = 90° | oP | oS | oI | oF |
| Tetragonal | | a = b α = β = γ = 90° | tP | | tI | |
| Hexagonal | Rhombohedral | a = b = c α = β = γ | hR | | | |
| Hexagonal | Hexagonal | a = b α = β = 90°, γ = 120° | hP | | | |
| Cubic | | a = b = c α = β = γ = 90° | cP | | cI | cF |

==== Redundant and non-existent lattice centerings ====
Although pairing 7 lattice systems with 4 possible centering yields 7 × 4 = 28 theoretical combinations, only 14 are unique Bravais lattices. The remaining 14 combinations are excluded for one of two fundamental reasons:

===== 1. Destruction of required crystal symmetry =====
Adding certain centerings breaks the characteristic symmetry operations required by that crystal system.

- Base-centered cubic (absent): Placing centering points on only one pair of opposite faces removes the threefold rotation axes (111) that define the cubic crystal system. The resulting lattice is not cubic, but rather a body-centered tetragonal lattice with a smaller unit cell.

===== 2. Equivalence to a standard Bravais lattice via cell redefinition =====
Adding centerings produces a grid of lattice points that can be re-described as an existing, simpler Bravais lattice.

- Face-centered tetragonal (redundant): Generates an array of points that forms an equivalent body-centered tetragonal lattice rotated by 45° around the c-axis, with a unit cell volume halved.
- Base-centered tetragonal (redundant): Centering the base of a tetragonal cell along the xy-plane (C-centering) forms an equivalent primitive tetragonal lattice rotated by 45° around the z-axis, with a unit cell volume halved.
- Body-centered monoclinic (redundant): Can be mapped to a standard base-centered monoclinic (C) lattice through an oblique choice of axes within the mirror/twofold plane.

== In 4 dimensions ==
In four-dimensional space there are 23 crystal families, 33 crystal systems and 33 lattice systems. The relation between four-dimensional crystal families, crystal systems, and lattice systems is shown in the following table.

Enantiomorphic systems are marked with an asterisk. The number of enantiomorphic pairs is given in parentheses. Here the term "enantiomorphic" has a different meaning than in the table for three-dimensional crystal classes. The latter means, that enantiomorphic point groups describe chiral (enantiomorphic) structures. In the current table, "enantiomorphic" means that a group itself (considered as a geometric object) is enantiomorphic, like enantiomorphic pairs of three-dimensional space groups P3_{1} and P3_{2}, P4_{1}22 and P4_{3}22. Starting from four-dimensional space, point groups also can be enantiomorphic in this sense.

Crystal families in 4D space
| No. of crystal family | Crystal family | Point group classification | | Space groups | Lattice classification | |
| No. of crystal family | Crystal family | Crystal system | Point groups | Space groups | Bravais lattices | Lattice system |
|---|---|---|---|---|---|---|
| I | Hexaclinic | Hexaclinic | 2 | 2 | 1 | Hexaclinic P |
| II | Triclinic | Triclinic | 3 | 13 | 2 | Triclinic P, S |
| III | Diclinic | Diclinic | 2 | 12 | 3 | Diclinic P, S, D |
| IV | Monoclinic | Monoclinic | 4 | 207 | 6 | Monoclinic P, S, S, I, D, F |
| V | Orthogonal | Non-axial orthogonal | 2 | 2 | 1 | Orthogonal KU |
| V | Orthogonal | Non-axial orthogonal | 2 | 112 | 8 | Orthogonal P, S, I, Z, D, F, G, U |
| V | Orthogonal | Axial orthogonal | 3 | 887 | 8 | Orthogonal P, S, I, Z, D, F, G, U |
| VI | Tetragonal monoclinic | Tetragonal monoclinic | 7 | 88 | 2 | Tetragonal monoclinic P, I |
| VII | Hexagonal monoclinic | Trigonal monoclinic | 5 | 9 | 1 | Hexagonal monoclinic R |
| VII | Hexagonal monoclinic | Trigonal monoclinic | 5 | 15 | 1 | Hexagonal monoclinic P |
| VII | Hexagonal monoclinic | Hexagonal monoclinic | 7 | 25 | 1 | Hexagonal monoclinic P |
| VIII | Ditetragonal diclinic* | Ditetragonal diclinic* | 1 (+1) | 1 (+1) | 1 (+1) | Ditetragonal diclinic P* |
| IX | Ditrigonal (dihexagonal) diclinic* | Ditrigonal diclinic* | 2 (+2) | 2 (+2) | 1 (+1) | Ditrigonal diclinic P* |
| X | Tetragonal orthogonal | Inverse tetragonal orthogonal | 5 | 7 | 1 | Tetragonal orthogonal KG |
| X | Tetragonal orthogonal | Inverse tetragonal orthogonal | 5 | 351 | 5 | Tetragonal orthogonal P, S, I, Z, G |
| X | Tetragonal orthogonal | Proper tetragonal orthogonal | 10 | 1312 | 5 | Tetragonal orthogonal P, S, I, Z, G |
| XI | Hexagonal orthogonal | Trigonal orthogonal | 10 | 81 | 2 | Hexagonal orthogonal R, RS |
| XI | Hexagonal orthogonal | Trigonal orthogonal | 10 | 150 | 2 | Hexagonal orthogonal P, S |
| XI | Hexagonal orthogonal | Hexagonal orthogonal | 12 | 240 | 2 | Hexagonal orthogonal P, S |
| XII | Ditetragonal monoclinic* | Ditetragonal monoclinic* | 1 (+1) | 6 (+6) | 3 (+3) | Ditetragonal monoclinic P*, S*, D* |
| XIII | Ditrigonal (dihexagonal) monoclinic* | Ditrigonal monoclinic* | 2 (+2) | 5 (+5) | 2 (+2) | Ditrigonal monoclinic P*, RR* |
| XIV | Ditetragonal orthogonal | Crypto-ditetragonal orthogonal | 5 | 10 | 1 | Ditetragonal orthogonal D |
| XIV | Ditetragonal orthogonal | Crypto-ditetragonal orthogonal | 5 | 165 (+2) | 2 | Ditetragonal orthogonal P, Z |
| XIV | Ditetragonal orthogonal | Ditetragonal orthogonal | 6 | 127 | 2 | Ditetragonal orthogonal P, Z |
| XV | Hexagonal tetragonal | Hexagonal tetragonal | 22 | 108 | 1 | Hexagonal tetragonal P |
| XVI | Dihexagonal orthogonal | Crypto-ditrigonal orthogonal* | 4 (+4) | 5 (+5) | 1 (+1) | Dihexagonal orthogonal G* |
| XVI | Dihexagonal orthogonal | Crypto-ditrigonal orthogonal* | 4 (+4) | 5 (+5) | 1 | Dihexagonal orthogonal P |
| XVI | Dihexagonal orthogonal | Dihexagonal orthogonal | 11 | 20 | 1 | Dihexagonal orthogonal P |
| XVI | Dihexagonal orthogonal | Ditrigonal orthogonal | 11 | 41 | 1 | Dihexagonal orthogonal P |
| XVI | Dihexagonal orthogonal | Ditrigonal orthogonal | 11 | 16 | 1 | Dihexagonal orthogonal RR |
| XVII | Cubic orthogonal | Simple cubic orthogonal | 5 | 9 | 1 | Cubic orthogonal KU |
| XVII | Cubic orthogonal | Simple cubic orthogonal | 5 | 96 | 5 | Cubic orthogonal P, I, Z, F, U |
| XVII | Cubic orthogonal | Complex cubic orthogonal | 11 | 366 | 5 | Cubic orthogonal P, I, Z, F, U |
| XVIII | Octagonal* | Octagonal* | 2 (+2) | 3 (+3) | 1 (+1) | Octagonal P* |
| XIX | Decagonal | Decagonal | 4 | 5 | 1 | Decagonal P |
| XX | Dodecagonal* | Dodecagonal* | 2 (+2) | 2 (+2) | 1 (+1) | Dodecagonal P* |
| XXI | Diisohexagonal orthogonal | Simple diisohexagonal orthogonal | 9 (+2) | 19 (+5) | 1 | Diisohexagonal orthogonal RR |
| XXI | Diisohexagonal orthogonal | Simple diisohexagonal orthogonal | 9 (+2) | 19 (+3) | 1 | Diisohexagonal orthogonal P |
| XXI | Diisohexagonal orthogonal | Complex diisohexagonal orthogonal | 13 (+8) | 15 (+9) | 1 | Diisohexagonal orthogonal P |
| XXII | Icosagonal (icosahedral) | Icosagonal | 7 | 20 | 2 | Icosagonal P, SN |
| XXIII | Hypercubic | Octagonal hypercubic | 21 (+8) | 73 (+15) | 1 | Hypercubic P |
| XXIII | Hypercubic | Octagonal hypercubic | 21 (+8) | 107 (+28) | 1 | Hypercubic Z |
| XXIII | Hypercubic | Dodecagonal hypercubic | 16 (+12) | 25 (+20) | 1 | Hypercubic Z |
| Total | 23 (+6) | 33 (+7) | 227 (+44) | 4783 (+111) | 64 (+10) | 33 (+7) |

The names here are given according to Whittaker. They are almost the same as in Brown et al., with exception for names of the crystal families 9, 13, and 22. The names for these three families according to Brown et al. are given in parentheses.

== See also ==
- Crystal cluster – Group of crystals formed in an open space
- Crystal structure – Ordered arrangement of atoms, ions, or molecules in a crystalline material
- Geometrical crystallography before X-rays – History of geometrical crystallography to 1895
- List of space groups
- Polar point group

== Works cited ==
- Hahn, Theo, ed. (2002). International Tables for Crystallography, Volume A: Space Group Symmetry. Vol. A (5th ed.). Berlin, New York: Springer-Verlag. doi:10.1107/97809553602060000100. ISBN 978-0-7923-6590-7.
