= Anisodesmic crystal =

An anisodesmic crystal (sometimes anisodemic crystal) is a crystal containing bonds with differing electrostatic valencies. An example is anhydrite. All other crystals are known as isodesmic crystals (or isodemic) and examples include diamond and halite. These terms are of particular importance when discussing the structural chemistry of minerals.

== Overview ==
The electrostatic valency is a measure of the strength of bonds, being the valence charge divided by the coordination number. Linus Pauling's second rule of ionic bonding, the Electrostatic Valence Principle states, "An ionic structure will be stable to the extent that the sum of the strengths of the electrostatic bonds that reach an anion equals the charge on that anion."

When there is more than one type of bonding in a crystal, strongly anisotropic physical properties can result such as those of graphite. Many other substances have anisotropic physical properties. Such properties are directly related to the atomic structures of the substances. Conversely, halite is an example of an isotropic crystal with equal hardness in all directions.

== See also ==
- Crystal cluster
- Colloidal crystal
- Cryptocrystalline
