= Categorical trace =

Generalization of matrix trace

In category theory, a branch of mathematics, the categorical trace is a generalization of the trace of a matrix.

== Definition ==
The trace is defined in the context of a symmetric monoidal category C, i.e., a category equipped with a suitable notion of a product $\otimes$. (The notation reflects that the product is, in many cases, a kind of a tensor product.) An object X in such a category C is called dualizable if there is another object $X^\vee$ playing the role of a dual object of X. In this situation, the trace of a morphism $f: X \to X$ is defined as the composition of the following morphisms: $\mathrm{tr}(f) : 1 \ \stackrel{coev}{\longrightarrow}\ X \otimes X^\vee \ \stackrel{f \otimes \operatorname{id}}{\longrightarrow}\ X \otimes X^\vee \ \stackrel{twist}{\longrightarrow}\ X^\vee \otimes X \ \stackrel{eval}{\longrightarrow}\ 1$ where 1 is the monoidal unit and the extremal morphisms are the coevaluation and evaluation, which are part of the definition of dualizable objects.

The same definition applies, to great effect, also when C is a symmetric monoidal ∞-category.

== Examples ==
- If C is the category of vector spaces over a fixed field k, the dualizable objects are precisely the finite-dimensional vector spaces, and the trace in the sense above is the morphism

$$k \to k$$

which is the multiplication by the trace of the endomorphism f in the usual sense of linear algebra.

- More generally, in the category of modules over a ring R, the dualizable objects are the finitely generated projective modules. The dual of such a module M is $M^*=\operatorname{Hom}(M,R)$, and the evaluation map $M^*\otimes_RM\to R$, $\phi\otimes x\mapsto\phi(x)$ (extended linearly), allows the identification $M^*\otimes_RM=\operatorname{End}_R(M)$, under which the trace of an endomorphism is, again, given by multiplication with the trace, the value of the map $M^*\otimes_RM\to R$ above. Similarly, one can define a trace for endomorphisms of locally free sheaves of finite rank on a ringed space, see Sheaf of modules § Operations.
- If C is the ∞-category of chain complexes of modules (over a fixed commutative ring R), dualizable objects V in C are precisely the perfect complexes. The trace in this setting captures, for example, the Euler characteristic, which is the alternating sum of the ranks of its terms:

$\mathrm{tr}(\operatorname{id}_V) = \sum_i (-1)^i \operatorname {rank} V_i.$

== Further applications ==
Kondyrev & Prikhodko (2018) have used categorical trace methods to prove an algebro-geometric version of the Atiyah–Bott fixed point formula, an extension of the Lefschetz fixed point formula.

== See also ==
- Pivotal category, a not necessarily symmetric category where traces can be defined
- Traced monoidal category
