= Isodesmic crystal =

Crystal whose bonds all have the same electrostatic valency

An isodesmic crystal is a crystal in which all the bonds have the same electrostatic valency. This means that all the bonds are of the same strength. Diamonds and halite have isodesmic crystals. The opposite of an isodesmic crystal is an anisodesmic crystal, in which anions more strongly bonded to central coordinating cation. Graphite is an example of an anisodesmic crystal.
