= Lattice (module) =

In mathematics, particularly in the field of ring theory, a lattice is an algebraic structure which, informally, provides a general framework for taking a sparse set of points in a larger space. Lattices generalize several more specific notions, including integer lattices in real vector spaces, orders in algebraic number fields, and fractional ideals in integral domains. Formally, a lattice is a kind of module over a ring that is embedded in a vector space over a field.

== Formal definition ==
Let R be an integral domain with field of fractions K, and let V be a vector space over K (and thus also an R-module). An R-submodule M of a V is called a lattice if M is finitely generated over R. It is called full if V = K · M, i.e. if M contains a K-basis of V. Some authors require lattices to be full, but we do not adopt this convention in this article.

Any finitely-generated torsion-free module M over R can be considered as a full R-lattice by taking as the ambient space $M \otimes_R K$, the extension of scalars of M to K. To avoid this ambiguity, lattices are usually studied in the context of a fixed ambient space.

== Properties ==
The behavior of the base ring R of a lattice M strongly influences the behavior of M. If R is a Dedekind domain, M is completely decomposable (with respect to a suitable basis) as a direct sum of fractional ideals. Every lattice over a Dedekind domain is projective.

Lattices are well-behaved under localization and completion: A lattice M is equal to the intersection of all the localizations $M_{(\mathfrak{p})}$ of M at $\mathfrak{p}$. Further, two lattices are equal if and only if their localizations are equal at all primes. Over a Dedekind domain, the local-global-dictionary is even more robust: any two full R-lattices are equal all but finitely many localizations, and for any choice of $R_{(\mathfrak{p})}$-lattices $N_{(\mathfrak{p})}$ there exists an R-lattice M satisfying $M_{(\mathfrak{p})} = N_{(\mathfrak{p})}$. Over Dedekind domains a similar correspondence exists between R-lattices and collections of lattices $N_\mathfrak{p}$ over the completions of R with respect at primes $\mathfrak{p}$.

A pair of lattices M and N over R admit a notion of relative index analogous to that of integer lattices in $\mathbb{R}^n$. If M and N are projective (e.g. if R is a Dedekind domain), then M and N have trivial relative index if and only if M = N.

== Pure sublattices ==
An R-submodule N of M that is itself a lattice is an R-pure sublattice if M/N is R-torsion-free. There is a one-to-one correspondence between R-pure sublattices N of M and K-subspaces W of V, given by

$$N \mapsto W = K \cdot N ; \quad W \mapsto N = W \cap M. \,$$

== See also ==
- Lattice (group), for the case where M is a Z-module embedded in a vector space V over the field of real numbers R, and the Euclidean metric is used to describe the lattice structure
