= Duplication and elimination matrices =

In mathematics, especially in linear algebra and matrix theory, the duplication matrix and the elimination matrix are linear transformations used for transforming half-vectorizations of matrices into vectorizations or (respectively) vice versa.

== Duplication matrix ==
The duplication matrix $D_n$ is the unique $n^2 \times \frac{n(n+1)}{2}$ matrix which, for any $n \times n$ symmetric matrix $A$, transforms $\mathrm{vech}(A)$ into $\mathrm{vec}(A)$:

$$D_n \mathrm{vech}(A) = \mathrm{vec}(A)$$.

For the $2 \times 2$ symmetric matrix $A=\left[\begin{smallmatrix} a & b \\ b & d \end{smallmatrix}\right]$, this transformation reads

$$D_n \mathrm{vech}(A) = \mathrm{vec}(A) \implies \begin{bmatrix} 1&0&0 \\ 0&1&0 \\ 0&1&0 \\ 0&0&1 \end{bmatrix} \begin{bmatrix} a \\ b \\ d \end{bmatrix} = \begin{bmatrix} a \\ b \\ b \\ d \end{bmatrix}$$

The explicit formula for calculating the duplication matrix for a $n \times n$ matrix is:

$D^T_n = \sum \limits_{i \ge j} u_{ij} (\mathrm{vec}T_{ij})^T$

Where:

- $u_{ij}$ is a unit vector of order $\frac{1}{2} n (n+1)$ having the value $1$ in the position $(j-1)n+i - \frac{1}{2}j(j-1)$ and 0 elsewhere;
- $T_{ij}$ is a $n \times n$ matrix with 1 in position $(i,j)$ and $(j,i)$ and zero elsewhere

Here is a C++ function using Armadillo (C++ library):

arma::mat duplication_matrix(const int &n) {
    arma::mat out((n*(n+1))/2, n*n, arma::fill::zeros);
    for (int j = 0; j < n; ++j) {
        for (int i = j; i < n; ++i) {
            arma::vec u((n*(n+1))/2, arma::fill::zeros);
            u(j*n+i-((j+1)*j)/2) = 1.0;
            arma::mat T(n,n, arma::fill::zeros);
            T(i,j) = 1.0;
            T(j,i) = 1.0;
            out += u * arma::trans(arma::vectorise(T));
        }
    }
    return out.t();
}

== Elimination matrix ==
An elimination matrix $L_n$ is a $\frac{n(n+1)}{2} \times n^2$ matrix which, for any $n \times n$ matrix $A$, transforms $\mathrm{vec}(A)$ into $\mathrm{vech}(A)$:

$L_n \mathrm{vec}(A) = \mathrm{vech}(A)$.

By the explicit (constructive) definition given by Magnus & Neudecker (1980), the $\frac{1}{2}n(n+1)$ by $n^2$ elimination matrix $L_n$ is given by

$$L_n = \sum_{i \geq j} u_{ij} \mathrm{vec}(E_{ij})^T = \sum_{i \geq j} (u_{ij}\otimes e_j^T \otimes e_i^T),$$

where $e_i$ is a unit vector whose $i$-th element is one and zeros elsewhere, and $E_{ij} = e_ie_j^T$.

Here is a C++ function using Armadillo (C++ library):

arma::mat elimination_matrix(const int &n) {
    arma::mat out((n*(n+1))/2, n*n, arma::fill::zeros);
    for (int j = 0; j < n; ++j) {
        arma::rowvec e_j(n, arma::fill::zeros);
        e_j(j) = 1.0;
        for (int i = j; i < n; ++i) {
            arma::vec u((n*(n+1))/2, arma::fill::zeros);
            u(j*n+i-((j+1)*j)/2) = 1.0;
            arma::rowvec e_i(n, arma::fill::zeros);
            e_i(i) = 1.0;
            out += arma::kron(u, arma::kron(e_j, e_i));
        }
    }
    return out;
}

For the $2 \times 2$ matrix $A = \left[\begin{smallmatrix} a & b \\ c & d \end{smallmatrix}\right]$, one choice for this transformation is given by

$$L_n \mathrm{vec}(A) = \mathrm{vech}(A) \implies \begin{bmatrix} 1&0&0&0 \\ 0&1&0&0 \\ 0&0&0&1 \end{bmatrix} \begin{bmatrix} a \\ c \\ b \\ d \end{bmatrix} = \begin{bmatrix} a \\ c \\ d \end{bmatrix}$$.
