= Traced monoidal category =

In category theory, a traced monoidal category is a category with some extra structure which gives a reasonable notion of feedback.

== Definition ==
A traced symmetric monoidal category is a symmetric monoidal category C together with a family of functions

$$\mathrm{Tr}^U_{X,Y}:\mathbf{C}(X\otimes U,Y\otimes U)\to\mathbf{C}(X,Y)$$

called a trace, satisfying the following conditions:

- naturality in $X$: for every $f:X\otimes U\to Y\otimes U$ and $g:X'\to X$,

$$\mathrm{Tr}^U_{X',Y}(f \circ (g\otimes \mathrm{id}_U)) = \mathrm{Tr}^U_{X,Y}(f) \circ g$$

Naturality in X

- naturality in $Y$: for every $f:X\otimes U\to Y\otimes U$ and $g:Y\to Y'$,

$$\mathrm{Tr}^U_{X,Y'}((g\otimes \mathrm{id}_U) \circ f) = g \circ \mathrm{Tr}^U_{X,Y}(f)$$

Naturality in Y

- dinaturality in $U$: for every $f:X\otimes U\to Y\otimes U'$ and $g:U'\to U$

$$\mathrm{Tr}^U_{X,Y}((\mathrm{id}_Y\otimes g) \circ f)=\mathrm{Tr}^{U'}_{X,Y}(f \circ (\mathrm{id}_X\otimes g))$$

Dinaturality in U

- vanishing I: for every $f:X \otimes I \to Y \otimes I$, (with $\rho_X \colon X\otimes I\cong X$ being the right unitor),

$$\mathrm{Tr}^I_{X,Y}(f)=\rho_Y \circ f \circ \rho_X^{-1}$$

Vanishing I

- vanishing II: for every $f:X\otimes U\otimes V\to Y\otimes U\otimes V$

$$\mathrm{Tr}^U_{X,Y}(\mathrm{Tr}^V_{X\otimes U,Y\otimes U}(f)) = \mathrm{Tr}^{U\otimes V}_{X,Y}(f)$$

Vanishing II

- superposing: for every $f:X\otimes U\to Y\otimes U$ and $g:W\to Z$,

$$g\otimes \mathrm{Tr}^U_{X,Y}(f)=\mathrm{Tr}^U_{W\otimes X,Z\otimes Y}(g\otimes f)$$

Superposing

- yanking:

$$\mathrm{Tr}^X_{X,X}(\gamma_{X,X})=\mathrm{id}_X$$

(where $\gamma$ is the symmetry of the monoidal category).

Yanking

== Properties ==
- Every compact closed category admits a trace (see Categorical trace).
- Given a traced monoidal category C, the Int construction generates the free (in some bicategorical sense) compact closure Int(C) of C.
