= Similarity invariance =

In linear algebra, similarity invariance is a property exhibited by a function whose value is unchanged under similarities of its domain. That is, $f$ is invariant under similarities if $f(A) = f(B^{-1}AB)$ where $B^{-1}AB$ is a matrix similar to A. Examples of such functions include the trace, determinant, characteristic polynomial, and the minimal polynomial.

A more colloquial phrase that means the same thing as similarity invariance is "basis independence", since a matrix can be regarded as a linear operator, written in a certain basis, and the same operator in a new basis is related to one in the old basis by the conjugation $B^{-1}AB$, where $B$ is the transformation matrix to the new basis.

== See also ==
- Invariant (mathematics)
- Gauge invariance
- Trace diagram
