= Crystal cluster =

Group of crystals formed in an open space

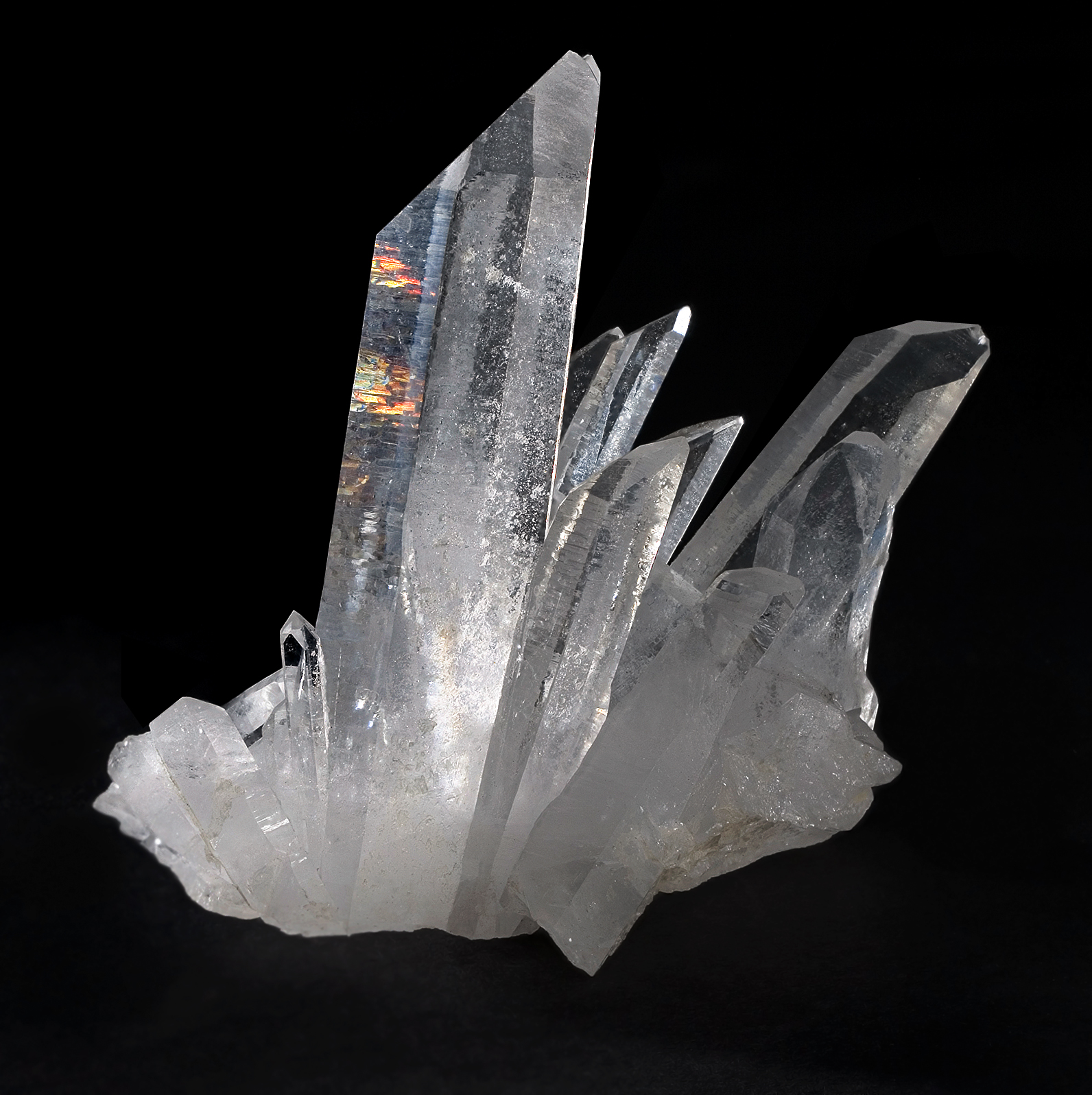
A quartz crystal cluster from Tibet

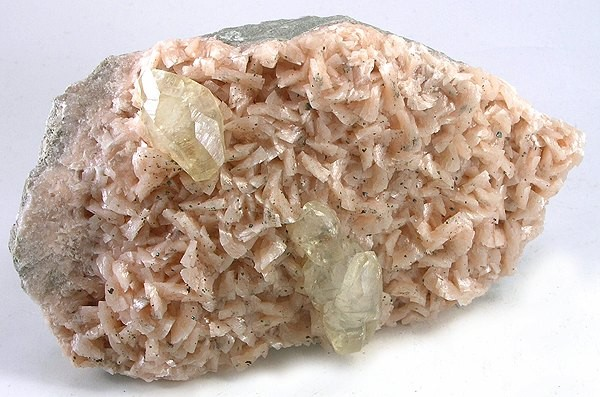
Dolomite druse (pink) with calcite crystals

A crystal cluster is a group of crystals which are formed in an open space environment and exhibit euhedral crystal form determined by their internal crystal structure. A cluster of small crystals coating the walls of a cavity are called druse.

== See also ==
- Crystallization – Process by which a solid with a highly organized atomic or molecular structure forms
