= Rectangular lattice =

2-dimensional lattice

Rectangular lattices
Primitive	Centered
pmm	cmm

The rectangular lattice and centered rectangular lattice (or rhombic lattice) constitute two of the five two-dimensional Bravais lattice types. The symmetry categories of these lattices are wallpaper groups pmm and cmm respectively. The conventional translation vectors of the rectangular lattices form an angle of 90° and are of unequal lengths.

== Bravais lattices ==
There are two rectangular Bravais lattices: primitive rectangular and centered rectangular (or rhombic).

Rectangular vs rhombic unit cells for the 2D rectangular lattices.

Bravais lattice	Rectangular	Centered rectangular
Pearson symbol	op	oc
Standard unit cell		
Rhombic unit cell		

The primitive rectangular lattice can also be described by a centered rhombic unit cell, while the centered rectangular lattice can also be described by a primitive rhombic unit cell. Note that the length $a$ in the lower row is not the same as in the upper row. For the first column above, $a$ of the second row equals $\sqrt{a^2+b^2}$ of the first row, and for the second column it equals $\frac{1}{2} \sqrt{a^2+b^2}$.

== Crystal classes ==
The rectangular lattice class names, Schönflies notation, Hermann-Mauguin notation, orbifold notation, Coxeter notation, and wallpaper groups are listed in the table below.

Geometric class, point group				Arithmetic class	Wallpaper groups	
Schön.	Intl	Orb.	Cox.	Arithmetic class	Wallpaper groups	
D_{1}	m	(*)	[ ]	Along	pm (**)	pg (××)
D_{1}	m	(*)	[ ]	Between	cm (*×)	
D_{2}	2mm	(*22)	[2]	Along	pmm (*2222)	pmg (22*)
D_{2}	2mm	(*22)	[2]	Between	cmm (2*22)	pgg (22×)
