= Oblique lattice =

2-dimensional inclined lattice

Oblique lattice	Wallpaper group p2	Unit cell

The oblique lattice is one of the five two-dimensional Bravais lattice types. The symmetry category of the lattice is wallpaper group p2. The primitive translation vectors of the oblique lattice form an angle other than 90° and are of unequal lengths.

== Crystal classes ==
The oblique lattice class names, Schönflies notation, Hermann-Mauguin notation, orbifold notation, Coxeter notation, and wallpaper groups are listed in the table below.

Geometric class, point group				Arithmetic class	Wallpaper groups
Schön.	Intl	Orb.	Cox.	Arithmetic class	Wallpaper groups
C_{1}	1	(1)	[ ]^{+}	None	p1 (1)
C_{2}	2	(22)	[2]^{+}	None	p2 (2222)
