= Direct sum of matrices =

Two matrices placed in the diagonal of a larger matrix

The direct sum of two matrices is the diagonal matrix where the top-left and bottom-right corners of the matrix fill the two given matrices, and where the top-right and bottom-left corners are all zeros.

== Definition ==
The direct sum of any pair of matrices A of size m × n and B of size p × q is a matrix of size (m + p) × (n + q) defined as:

$$\mathbf{A} \oplus \mathbf{B} =
\begin{bmatrix} \mathbf{A} & \boldsymbol{0} \\ \boldsymbol{0} & \mathbf{B} \end{bmatrix} =
\begin{bmatrix}
a_{11} & \cdots & a_{1n} &      0 & \cdots &      0 \\
\vdots & \ddots & \vdots & \vdots & \ddots & \vdots \\
a_{m 1} & \cdots & a_{mn} &      0 & \cdots &      0 \\
0 & \cdots &      0 & b_{11} & \cdots &  b_{1q} \\
\vdots & \ddots & \vdots & \vdots & \ddots & \vdots \\
0 & \cdots &      0 & b_{p1} & \cdots &  b_{pq}
\end{bmatrix}$$

For instance,

$$\begin{bmatrix}
1 & 3 & 2 \\
2 & 3 & 1
\end{bmatrix}
\oplus
\begin{bmatrix}
1 & 6 \\
0 & 1
\end{bmatrix}
=
\begin{bmatrix}
1 & 3 & 2 & 0 & 0 \\
2 & 3 & 1 & 0 & 0 \\
0 & 0 & 0 & 1 & 6 \\
0 & 0 & 0 & 0 & 1
\end{bmatrix}$$

The direct sum of matrices is a special type of block matrix. In particular, the direct sum of square matrices is a block diagonal matrix.

The adjacency matrix of the union of disjoint graphs (or multigraphs) is the direct sum of their adjacency matrices. Any element in the direct sum of two vector spaces of matrices can be represented as a direct sum of two matrices.

In general, the direct sum of n matrices is:

$$\bigoplus_{i=1}^{n} \mathbf{A}_{i} = \operatorname{diag}( \mathbf{A}_1, \mathbf{A}_2, \mathbf{A}_3, \ldots, \mathbf{A}_n) =
\begin{bmatrix}
\mathbf{A}_1 & \boldsymbol{0} & \cdots & \boldsymbol{0} \\
\boldsymbol{0} & \mathbf{A}_2 & \cdots & \boldsymbol{0} \\
\vdots & \vdots & \ddots & \vdots \\
\boldsymbol{0} & \boldsymbol{0} & \cdots & \mathbf{A}_n \\
\end{bmatrix}\,\!$$

where the zeros are actually blocks of zeros (i.e., zero matrices).

== See also ==
- Matrix addition
- Kronecker sum
