= Dot product representation of a graph =

A dot product representation of a simple graph is a method of representing a graph using vector spaces and the dot product from linear algebra. Every graph has a dot product representation.

== Definition ==
Let G be a graph with vertex set V. Let F be a field, and f a function from V to F^{k} such that xy is an edge of G if and only if f(x)·f(y) ≥ t. This is the dot product representation of G. The number t is called the dot product threshold, and the smallest possible value of k is called the dot product dimension.

== Properties ==
- A threshold graph is a dot product graph with positive t and dot product dimension 1.
- Every interval graph has dot product dimension at most 2.
- Every planar graph has dot product dimension at most 4.

== See also ==
- Adjacency matrix
