= Matrix addition =

Notions of sums for matrices in linear algebra

Illustration of the addition of two matrices.

In mathematics, matrix addition is the operation of adding two matrices by adding the corresponding entries together.

For a vector, $\vec{v}\!$, adding two matrices would have the geometric effect of applying each matrix transformation separately onto $\vec{v}\!$, then adding the transformed vectors.

$$\mathbf{A}\vec{v} + \mathbf{B}\vec{v} = (\mathbf{A} + \mathbf{B})\vec{v}\!$$

== Definition ==
Two matrices must have an equal number of rows and columns to be added. In which case, the sum of two matrices A and B will be a matrix which has the same number of rows and columns as A and B. The sum of A and B, denoted A + B, is computed by adding corresponding elements of A and B:

$$\begin{align}
\mathbf{A}+\mathbf{B} & = \begin{bmatrix}
a_{11} & a_{12} & \cdots & a_{1n} \\
a_{21} & a_{22} & \cdots & a_{2n} \\
\vdots & \vdots & \ddots & \vdots \\
a_{m1} & a_{m2} & \cdots & a_{mn} \\
\end{bmatrix} +
\begin{bmatrix}
b_{11} & b_{12} & \cdots & b_{1n} \\
b_{21} & b_{22} & \cdots & b_{2n} \\
\vdots & \vdots & \ddots & \vdots \\
b_{m1} & b_{m2} & \cdots & b_{mn} \\
\end{bmatrix} \\
& = \begin{bmatrix}
a_{11} + b_{11} & a_{12} + b_{12} & \cdots & a_{1n} + b_{1n} \\
a_{21} + b_{21} & a_{22} + b_{22} & \cdots & a_{2n} + b_{2n} \\
\vdots & \vdots & \ddots & \vdots \\
a_{m1} + b_{m1} & a_{m2} + b_{m2} & \cdots & a_{mn} + b_{mn} \\
\end{bmatrix} \\
\end{align}\,\!$$

Or more concisely (assuming that A + B = C):

$$c_{ij}=a_{ij}+b_{ij}$$

For example:

$$\begin{bmatrix}
1 & 3 \\
1 & 0 \\
1 & 2
\end{bmatrix}
+
\begin{bmatrix}
0 & 0 \\
7 & 5 \\
2 & 1
\end{bmatrix}
=
\begin{bmatrix}
1+0 & 3+0 \\
1+7 & 0+5 \\
1+2 & 2+1
\end{bmatrix}
=
\begin{bmatrix}
1 & 3 \\
8 & 5 \\
3 & 3
\end{bmatrix}$$

Similarly, it is also possible to subtract one matrix from another, as long as they have the same dimensions. The difference of A and B, denoted A − B, is computed by subtracting elements of B from corresponding elements of A, and has the same dimensions as A and B. For example:

$$\begin{bmatrix}
1 & 3 \\
1 & 0 \\
1 & 2
\end{bmatrix}
-
\begin{bmatrix}
0 & 0 \\
7 & 5 \\
2 & 1
\end{bmatrix}
=
\begin{bmatrix}
1-0 & 3-0 \\
1-7 & 0-5 \\
1-2 & 2-1
\end{bmatrix}
=
\begin{bmatrix}
1 & 3 \\
-6 & -5 \\
-1 & 1
\end{bmatrix}$$

== See also ==
- Matrix multiplication
- Vector addition
- Direct sum of matrices
- Kronecker sum
