= Probability vector =

Vector with non-negative entries that add up to one

In mathematics and statistics, a probability vector or stochastic vector is a vector with non-negative entries that add up to one.

The positions (indices) of a probability vector represent the possible outcomes of a discrete random variable, and the vector gives us the probability mass function of that random variable, which is the standard way of characterizing a discrete probability distribution.

== Examples ==
Here are some examples of probability vectors. The vectors can be either columns or rows.

- $$x_0=\begin{bmatrix}0.5 \\ 0.25 \\  0.25  \end{bmatrix},$$
- $$x_1=\begin{bmatrix} 0 \\ 1 \\ 0  \end{bmatrix},$$
- $$x_2=\begin{bmatrix} 0.65 & 0.35 \end{bmatrix},$$
- $$x_3=\begin{bmatrix} 0.3 & 0.5 & 0.07 &  0.1 & 0.03 \end{bmatrix}.$$

== Geometric interpretation ==
Writing out the vector components of a vector $p$ as

$$p=\begin{bmatrix} p_1 \\ p_2 \\ \vdots \\ p_n  \end{bmatrix}\quad \text{or} \quad p=\begin{bmatrix} p_1 & p_2 & \cdots & p_n  \end{bmatrix}$$

the vector components must sum to one:

$$\sum_{i=1}^n p_i = 1$$

Each individual component must have a probability between zero and one:

$$0\le p_i \le 1$$

for all $i$. Therefore, the set of stochastic vectors coincides with the standard $(n-1)$-simplex. It is a point if $n=1$, a segment if $n=2$, a (filled) triangle if $n=3$, a (filled) tetrahedron if $n=4$, etc.

== Properties ==
- The mean of the components of any probability vector is $1/n$.
- The shortest probability vector has the value $1/n$ as each component of the vector, and has a length of $1/\sqrt n$.
- The longest probability vector has the value 1 in a single component and 0 in all others, and has a length of 1.
- The shortest vector corresponds to maximum uncertainty, the longest to maximum certainty.
- The length of a probability vector is equal to $\sqrt {n\sigma^2 + 1/n}$; where $\sigma^2$ is the variance of the elements of the probability vector.

== See also ==
- Stochastic matrix
- Dirichlet distribution
