= 275th Division =

275th Division may refer to:

- 275th Infantry Division, Wehrmacht, Germany
- 275th Rifle Division, Soviet Union

== See also ==
- List of military divisions by number
