= Non-orthogonal frequency-division multiplexing =

Method of encoding digital data on multiple carrier frequencies

Non-orthogonal frequency-division multiplexing (N-OFDM) is a method of encoding digital data on multiple carrier frequencies with non-orthogonal intervals between frequency of sub-carriers. N-OFDM signals can be used in communication and radar systems.

== Subcarriers system ==
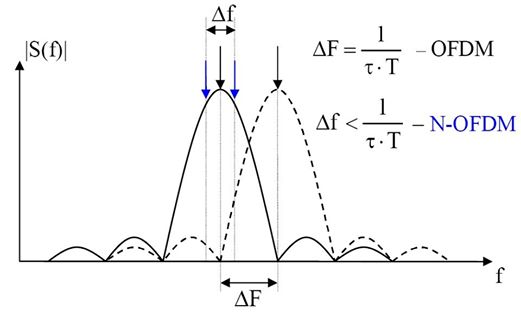
Subcarriers system of N-OFDM signals after FFT

The low-pass equivalent N-OFDM signal is expressed as:

$$\nu(t) = \sum_{k=0}^{N-1}X_k e^{j2\pi\alpha kt/T},\quad 0 \le t < T,$$

where $X_k$ are the data symbols, $N$ is the number of sub-carriers, and $T$ is the N-OFDM symbol time. The sub-carrier spacing $\alpha/T$ for $\alpha < 1$ makes them non-orthogonal over each symbol period.

== History ==
The history of N-OFDM signals theory was started in 1992 from the Patent of Russian Federation No. 2054684. In this patent, Vadym Slyusar proposed the 1st method of optimal processing for N-OFDM signals after Fast Fourier transform (FFT).

In this regard need to say that W. Kozek and A. F. Molisch wrote in 1998 about N-OFDM signals with $\alpha < 1$ that "it is not possible to recover the information from the received signal, even in the case of an ideal channel."

In 2001, V. Slyusar proposed non-orthogonal frequency digital modulation (N-OFDM) as an alternative of OFDM for communications systems.

The next publication about this method has priority in July 2002 before the conference paper regarding SEFDM of I. Darwazeh and M.R.D. Rodrigues (September, 2003).

== Advantages of N-OFDM ==
Despite the increased complexity of demodulating N-OFDM signals compared to OFDM, the transition to non-orthogonal subcarrier frequency arrangement provides several advantages:

1. higher spectral efficiency, which allows to reduce the frequency band occupied by the signal and improve the electromagnetic compatibility of many terminals;
2. adaptive detuning from interference concentrated in frequency by changing the nominal frequencies of the subcarriers;
3. an ability to take into account Doppler frequency shifts of subcarriers when working with subscribers moving at high speeds;
4. reduction of the peak factor of the multi-frequency signal mixture.

== Idealized system model ==
This section describes a simple idealized N-OFDM system model suitable for a time-invariant AWGN channel.

== Transmitter N-OFDM signals ==
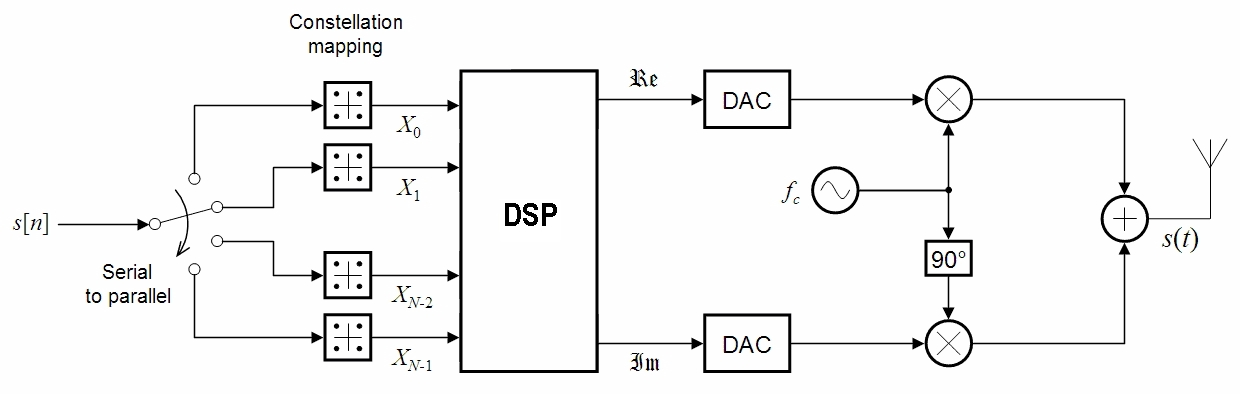

An N-OFDM carrier signal is the sum of a number of not-orthogonal subcarriers, with baseband data on each subcarrier being independently modulated commonly using some type of quadrature amplitude modulation (QAM) or phase-shift keying (PSK). This composite baseband signal is typically used to modulate a main RF carrier.

$s[n]$ is a serial stream of binary digits. By inverse multiplexing, these are first demultiplexed into $\scriptstyle N$ parallel streams, and each one mapped to a (possibly complex) symbol stream using some modulation constellation (QAM, PSK, etc.). Note that the constellations may be different, so some streams may carry a higher bit-rate than others.

A Digital Signal Processor (DSP) is computed on each set of symbols, giving a set of complex time-domain samples. These samples are then quadrature-mixed to passband in the standard way. The real and imaginary components are first converted to the analogue domain using digital-to-analogue converters (DACs); the analogue signals are then used to modulate cosine and sine waves at the carrier frequency, $f_\text{c}$, respectively. These signals are then summed to give the transmission signal, $s(t)$.

== Demodulation ==
=== Receiver ===
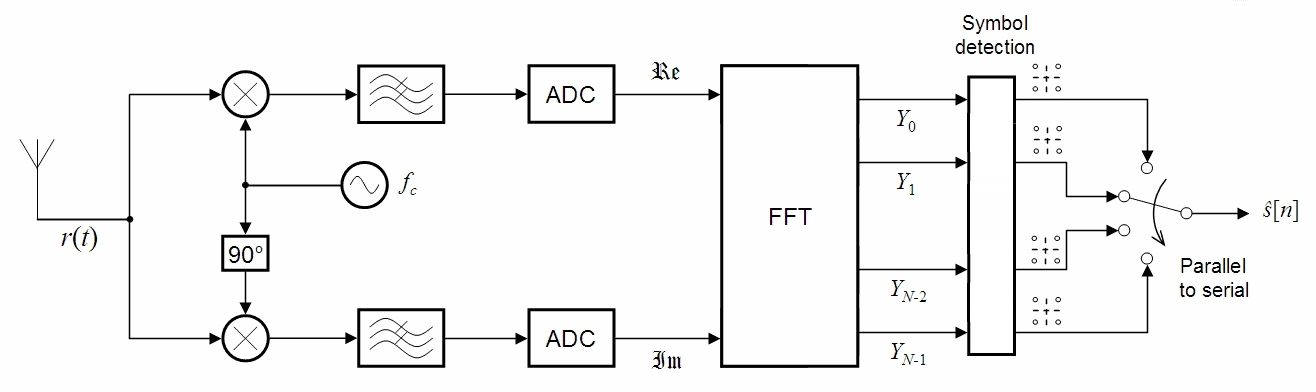

The receiver picks up the signal $r(t)$, which is then quadrature-mixed down to baseband using cosine and sine waves at the carrier frequency. This also creates signals centered on $2 f_\text{c}$, so low-pass filters are used to reject these. The baseband signals are then sampled and digitised using analog-to-digital converters (ADCs), and a forward FFT is used to convert back to the frequency domain.

This returns $N$ parallel streams, which use in appropriate symbol detector.

== Demodulation after FFT ==
The 1st method of optimal processing for N-OFDM signals after FFT was proposed in 1992.

== Demodulation without FFT ==
=== Demodulation by using of ADC samples ===
The method of optimal processing for N-OFDM signals without FFT was proposed in October 2003. In this case can be used ADC samples.

== N-OFDM+MIMO ==
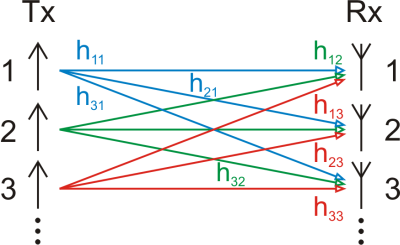
N-OFDM+MIMO system model

The combination N-OFDM and MIMO technology is similar to OFDM. To the building of MIMO system can be used digital antenna array as transmitter and receiver of N-OFDM signals.

== Fast-OFDM ==
Fast-OFDM method was proposed in 2002.

== Filter-bank multi-carrier modulation (FBMC) ==
Filter-bank multi-carrier modulation (FBMC) is. As example of FBMC can consider Wavelet N-OFDM.

=== Wavelet N-OFDM ===
N-OFDM has become a technique for power-line communications (PLC). In this area of research, a wavelet transform is introduced to replace the DFT as the method of creating non-orthogonal frequencies. This is due to the advantages wavelets offer, which are particularly useful on noisy power lines.

To create the sender signal the wavelet N-OFDM uses a synthesis bank consisting of a $N$-band transmultiplexer followed by the transform function

$$F_n(z) = \sum_{k=0}^{L-1} f_n(k) z^{-k},\quad 0 \leq n < N$$

On the receiver side, an analysis bank is used to demodulate the signal again. This bank contains an inverse transform

$$G_n(z) = \sum_{k=0}^{L-1} g_n(k) z^{-k},\quad 0 \leq n < N$$

followed by another $N$-band transmultiplexer. The relationship between both transform functions is

$$\begin{align}
f_n(k) &= g_n(L - 1 - k) \\
F_n(z) &= z^{-(L-1)} G_n * (z - 1)
\end{align}$$

== Spectrally-efficient FDM (SEFDM) ==
N-OFDM is a spectrally efficient method. All SEFDM methods are similar to N-OFDM.

== Generalized frequency division multiplexing (GFDM) ==
Generalized frequency division multiplexing (GFDM) is.

== See also ==
- OFDM
- COFDM
