= Vadym Slyusar =

Soviet and Ukrainian scientist

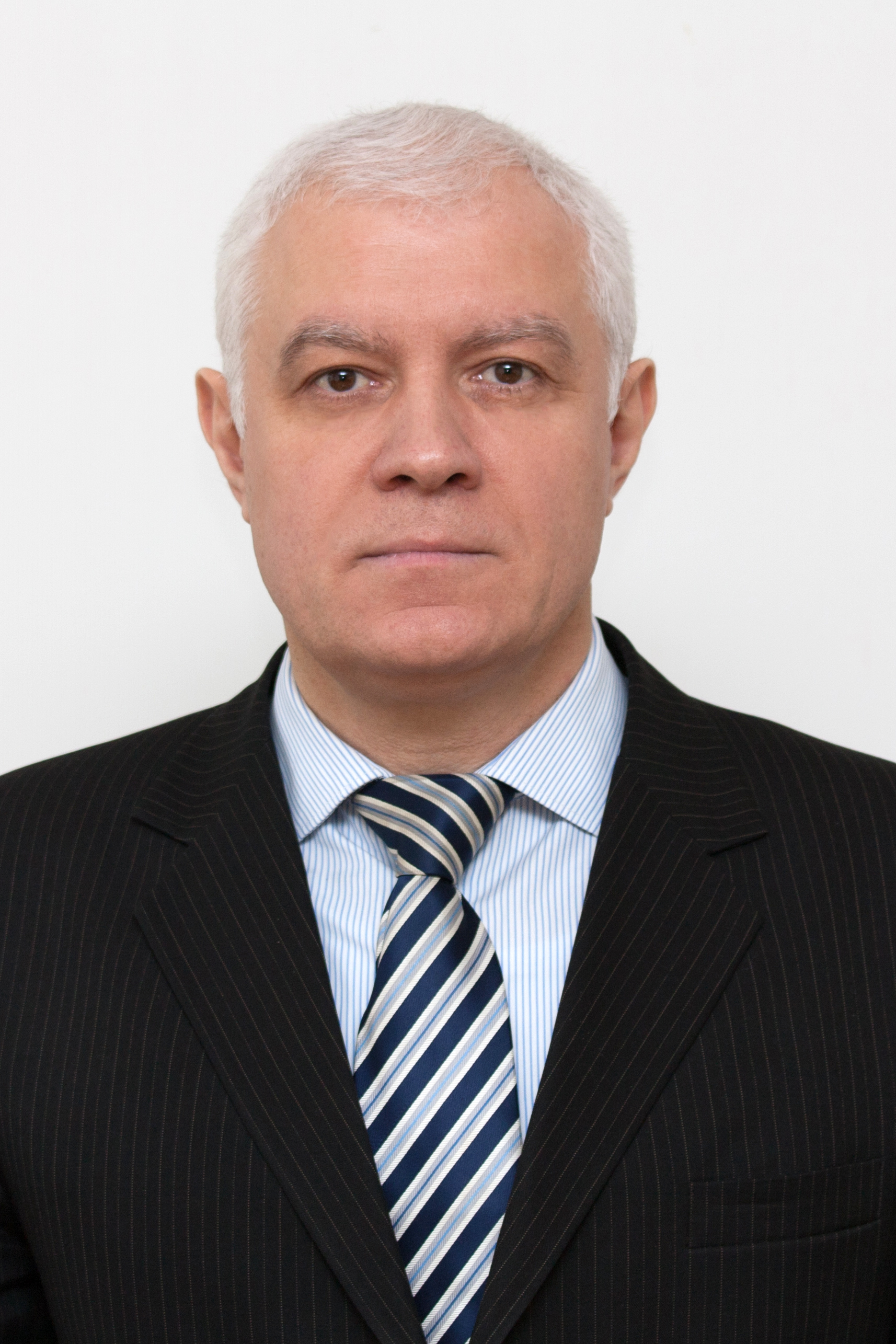
- Born: 15 October 1964 (age 61); Ukrainian SSR, Soviet Union
- Citizenship: Ukraine
- Education: Orenburg Air Defense high military school
- Known for: Digital antenna array
- Awards: Honored Scientist and Technician of Ukraine (2008)
- Scientific career
- Fields: Antenna theory Radar signal processing
- Workplaces: Central Scientific Research Institute of Armament and Military Equipment of the Armed Forces of Ukraine
- Doctoral advisor: 17 persons

Vadym Slyusar (born 15 October 1964, vil. Kolotii, Reshetylivka Raion, Poltava region, Ukraine) is a Soviet and Ukrainian scientist, professor, Doctor of Technical Sciences, Honored Scientist and Technician of Ukraine, founder of tensor-matrix theory of digital antenna arrays (DAAs), N-OFDM and other theories in fields of radar systems, smart antennas for wireless communications and digital beamforming.

== Scientific results ==
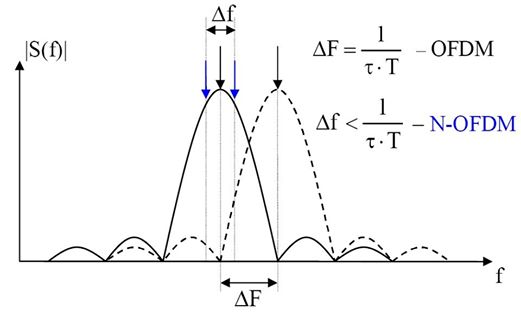
Subcarriers system of N-OFDM signals after FFT proposed by V. Slyusar in 1992

=== N-OFDM theory ===
In 1992 Vadym Slyusar patented the 1st optimal demodulation method for N-OFDM signals after Fast Fourier transform (FFT). From this patent was started the history of N-OFDM signals theory. In this regard, W. Kozek and A. F. Molisch wrote in 1998 about N-OFDM signals with the sub-carrier spacing $\alpha < 1$, that "it is not possible to recover the information from the received signal, even in the case of an ideal channel." But in 2001 Vadym Slyusar proposed such Non-orthogonal frequency digital modulation (N-OFDM) as an alternative of OFDM for communications systems.

The next publication of V. Slysuar about this method has priority in July 2002 before the conference paper of I. Darwazeh and M.R.D. Rodrigues (September 2003) regarding SEFDM. The description of the method of optimal processing for N-OFDM signals without FFT of ADC samples was transferred to publication by V. Slyusar in October 2003.

The theory N-OFDM of V. Slyusar inspired numerous investigations in this area of other scientists.

=== Tensor-matrix theory of digital antenna array ===
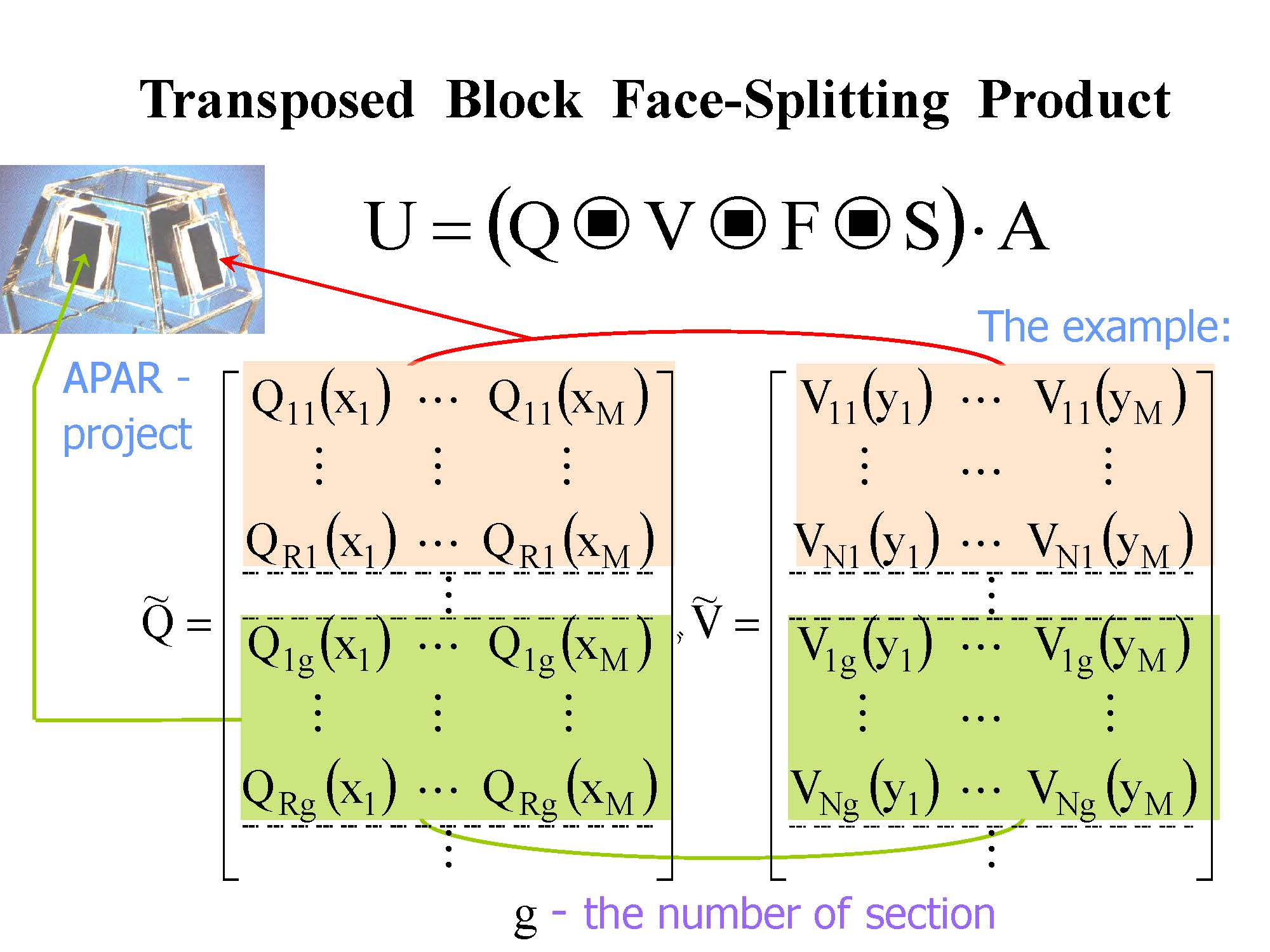
Transposed Block Face-splitting product in the context of a Multi-Face radar model

In 1996 V. Slyusar proposed the column-wise Khatri–Rao product to estimate four coordinates of signals sources at a digital antenna array. The alternative concept of the matrix product, which uses row-wise splitting of matrices with a given quantity of rows (Face-splitting product), was proposed by V. Slyusar in 1996 as well. After these results the tensor-matrix theory of digital antenna arrays and new matrix operations was evolved (such as the Block Face-splitting product, Generalized Face-splitting product, Matrix Derivative of Face-splitting product etc.), which used also in artificial intelligence and machine learning systems to minimization of convolution and tensor sketch operations, in a popular Natural Language Processing models, and hypergraph models of similarity.

The Face-splitting product and his properties used for multidimensional smoothing with P-splines and Generalized linear array model in the statistic in two- and multidimensional approximations of data as well.

=== Theory of odd-order I/Q demodulators ===
The theory of odd-order I/Q demodulators, which was proposed by V. Slyusar in 2014, started from his investigations of the tandem scheme of two-stage signal processing for the design of an I/Q demodulator and multistage I/Q demodulators concept in 2012. As result, Slyusar "presents a new class of I/Q demodulators with odd order derived from the even order I/Q demodulator which is characterized by linear phase-frequency relation for wideband signals".

=== Results in the other fields of research ===
V. Slyusar provided numerous theoretical works realized in several experimental radar stations with DAAs which were successfully tested.

He investigated electrical small antennas and new constructions of such antennas, evolved the theory of metamaterials, proposed new ideas to implementation of augmented reality, and artificial intelligence to combat vehicles as well.

V. Slyusar has 68 patents, and 850 publications in the areas of digital antenna arrays for radars and wireless communications.

== Career Timeline ==
1981–1985 – listener of Orenburg Air Defense high military school. In this time started the scientific carrier of V. Slyusar, which published a first scientific report in 1985.

June 1992 – defended the dissertation for a candidate degree (Techn. Sci.) at the Council of Military Academy of Air Defense of the Land Forces (Kyiv). The significant stage of the recognition of Vadym Slyusar's scientific results became the defense of the dissertation for a doctoral degree (Techn. Sci.) in 2000.

professor – since 2005, Honored Scientist and Technician of Ukraine – 2008.

Since 1996 – work at Central Scientific Research Institute of Armament and Military Equipment of the Armed Forces of Ukraine (Kyiv). Military Rank – Colonel.

Since 2003 – participates in Ukraine-NATO cooperation as head of the national delegations, a person of contact, and national representative within experts groups of NATO Conference of National Armaments Directors and technical members of the Research Task Groups (RTG) of NATO Science and Technology Organisation (STO).

Since 2009 – member of editorial board of Izvestiya Vysshikh Uchebnykh Zavedenii. Radioelektronika.

== Selected awards ==
- Honored Scientist and Technician of Ukraine (2008)
- Soviet and Ukraine military medals

== Gallery ==
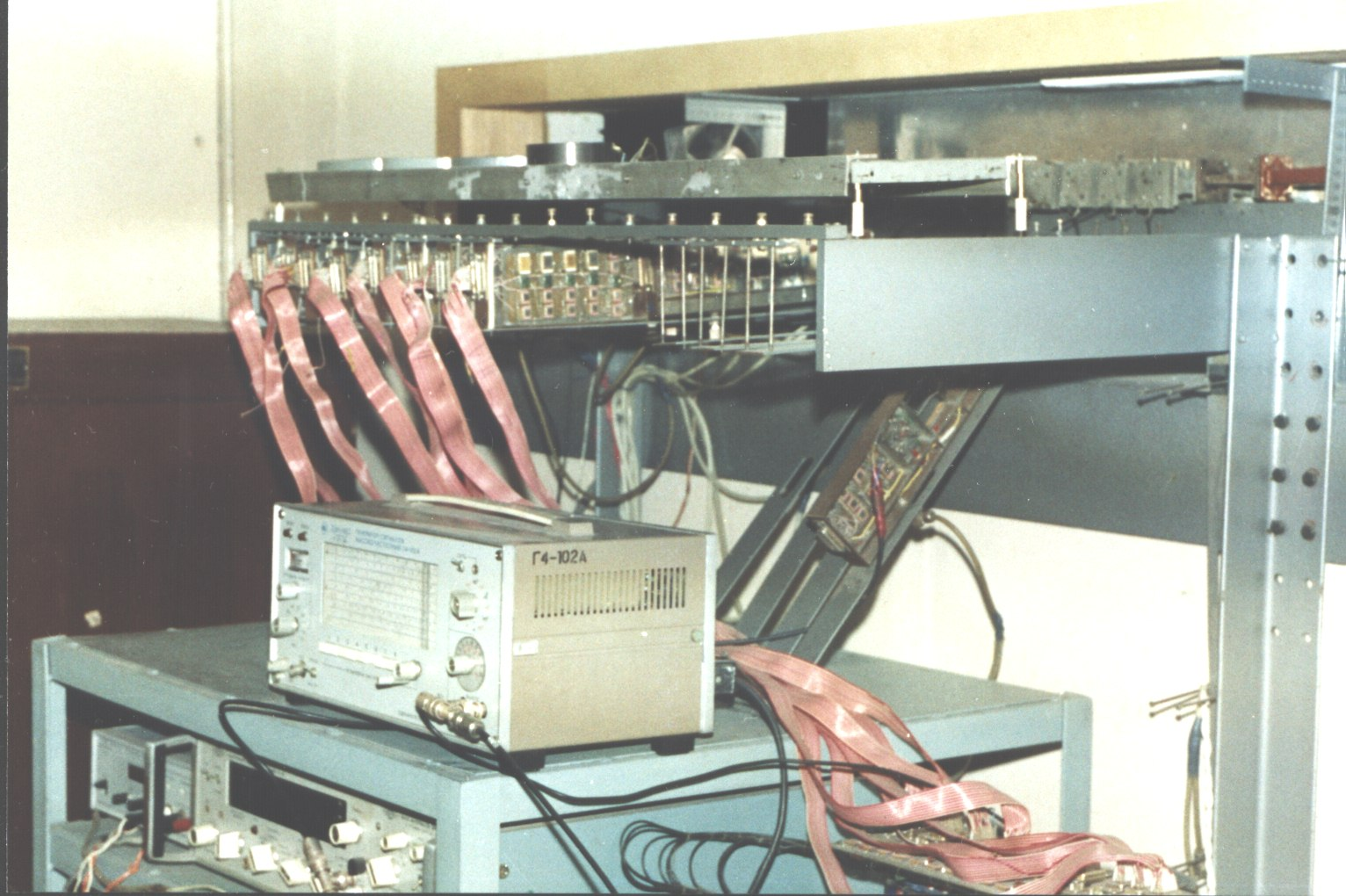
The technology demonstrator of 8-channels DAA, developed by V. Slyusar participation (USSR, 1989)

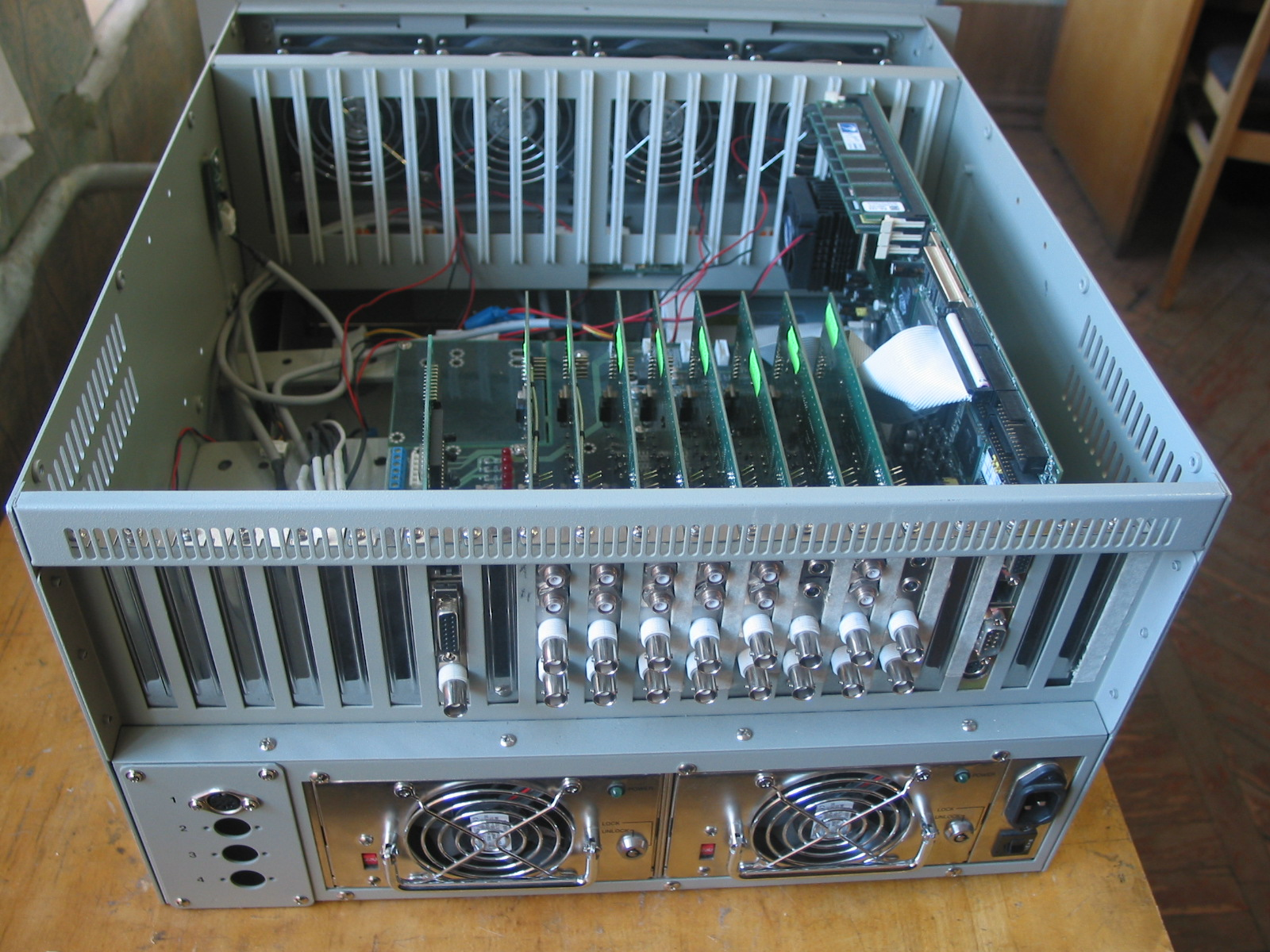
A digital part of 8-channels digital antenna array, proposed V. Slyusar

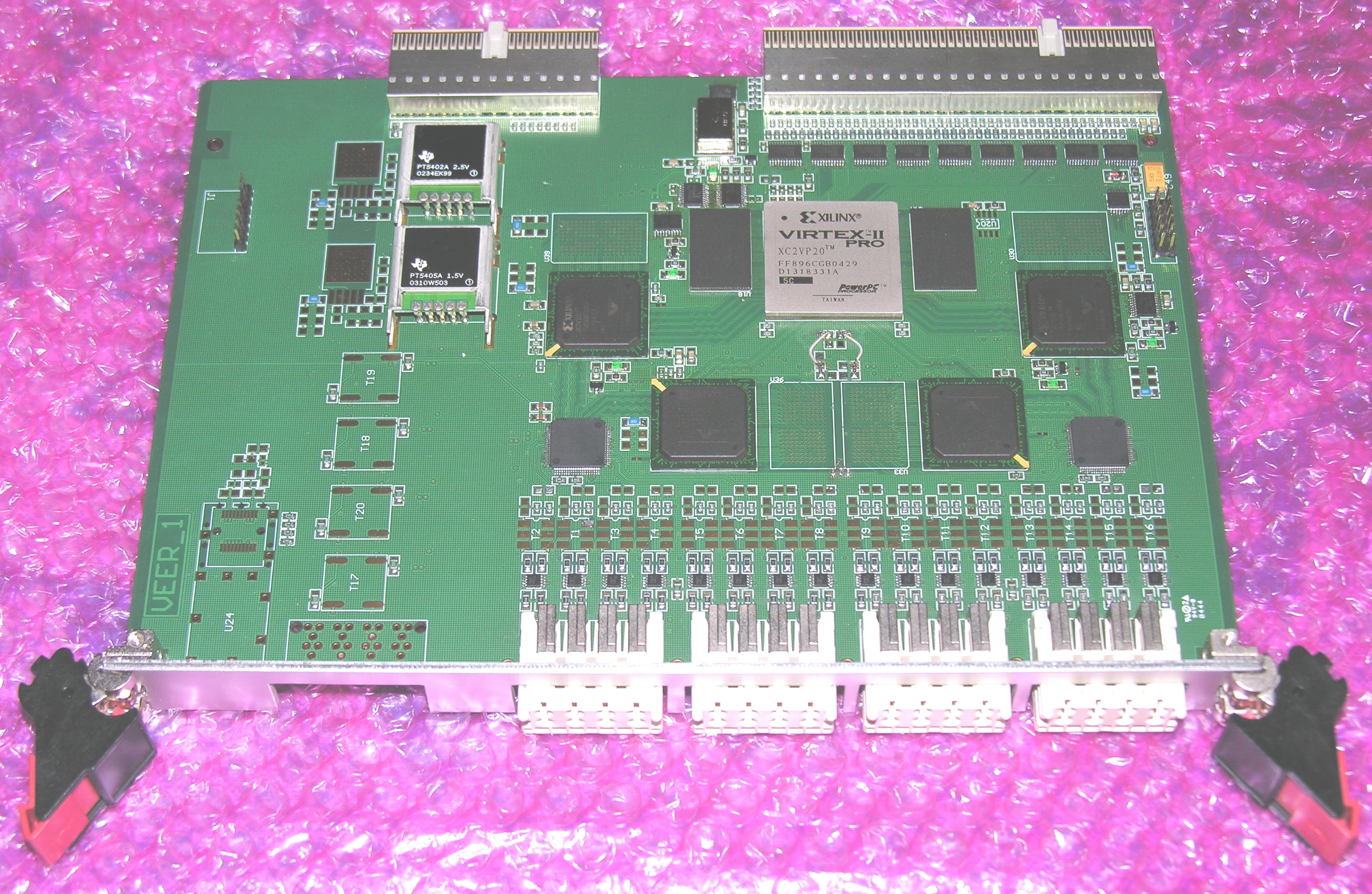
16-channels unit of ADCs and DSP with CompactPCI interface, proposed V. Slyusar

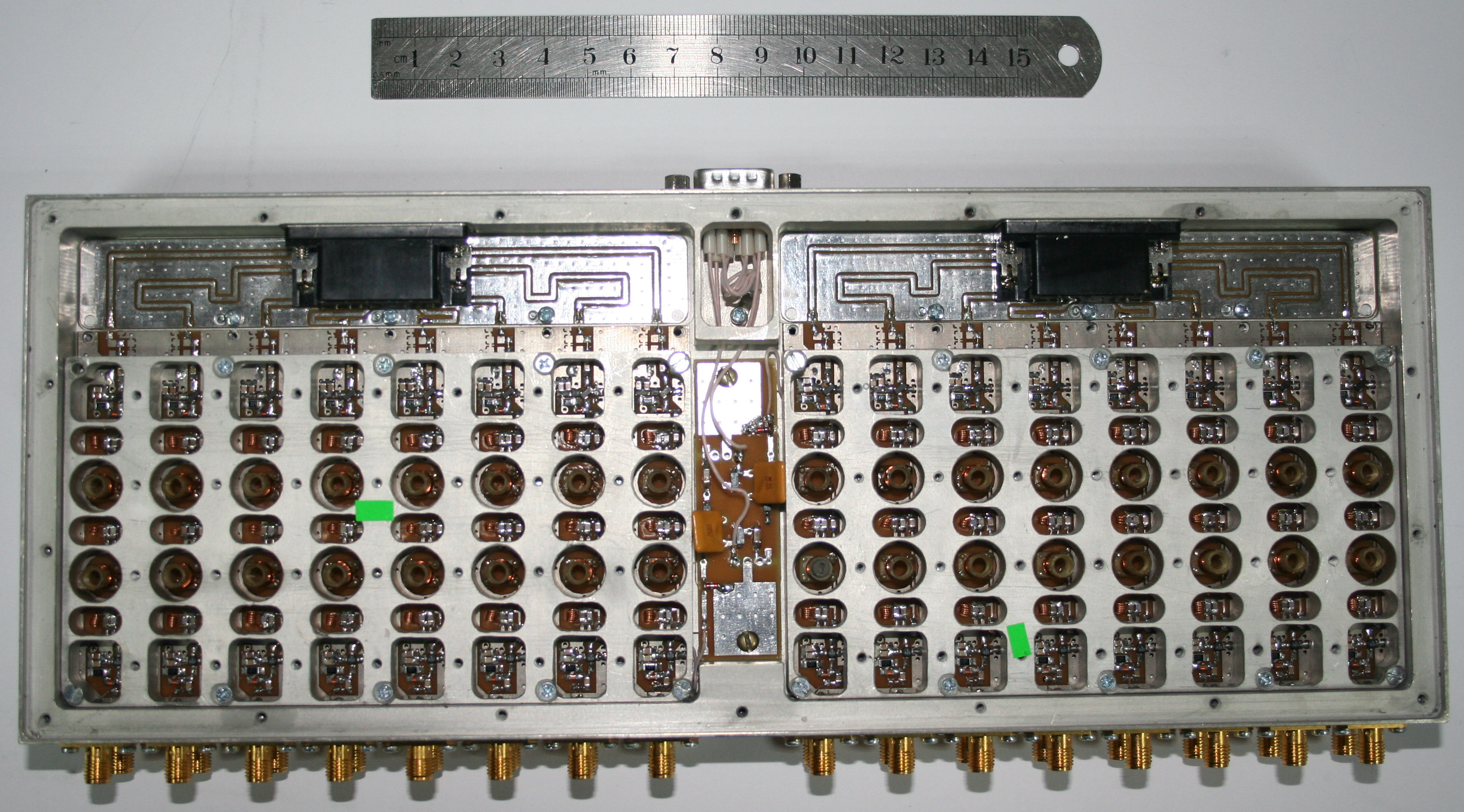
Multichannel analogue receiver unit, patented V. Slyusar with co-authors

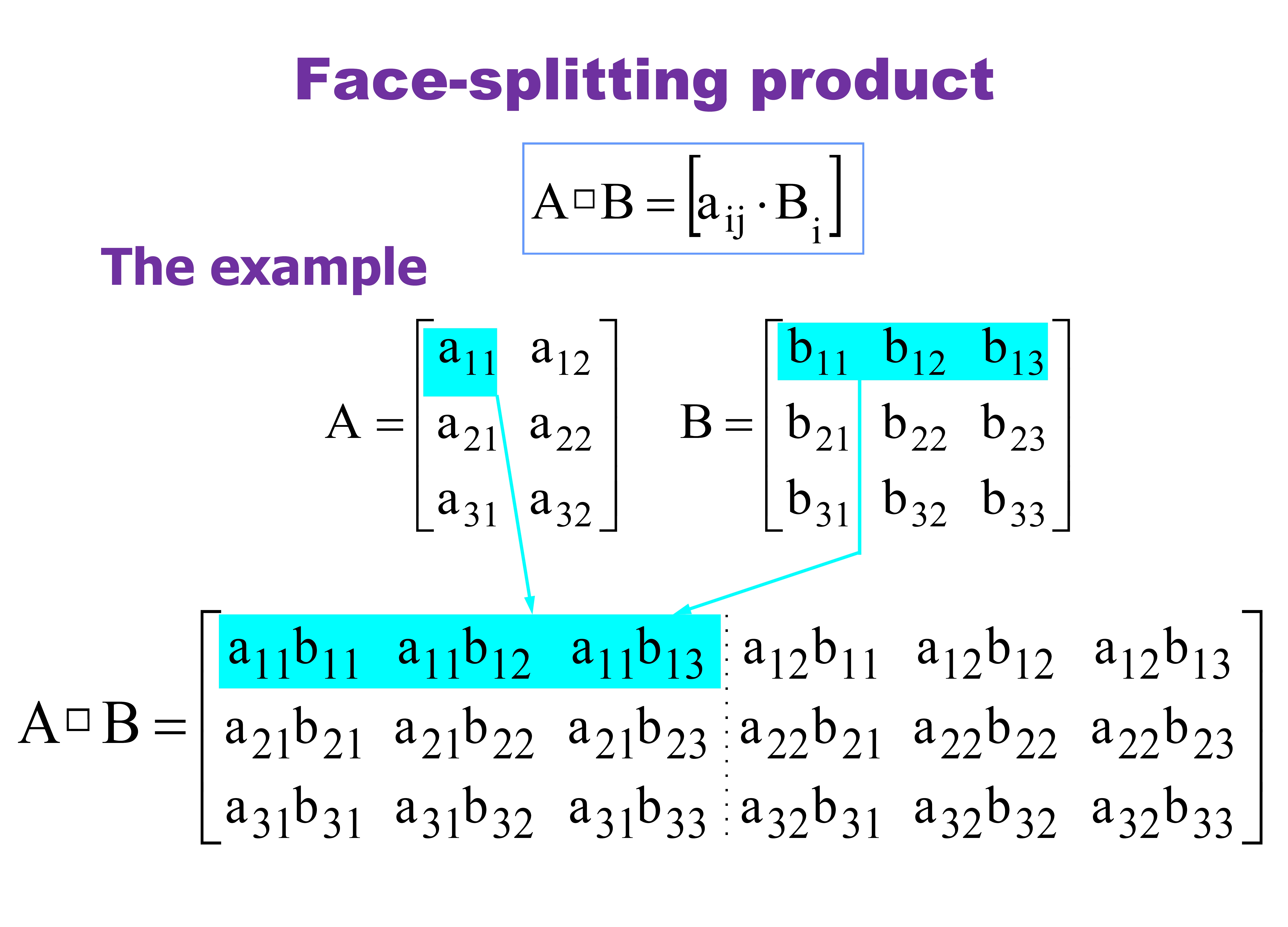
Face-splitting Product of matrices

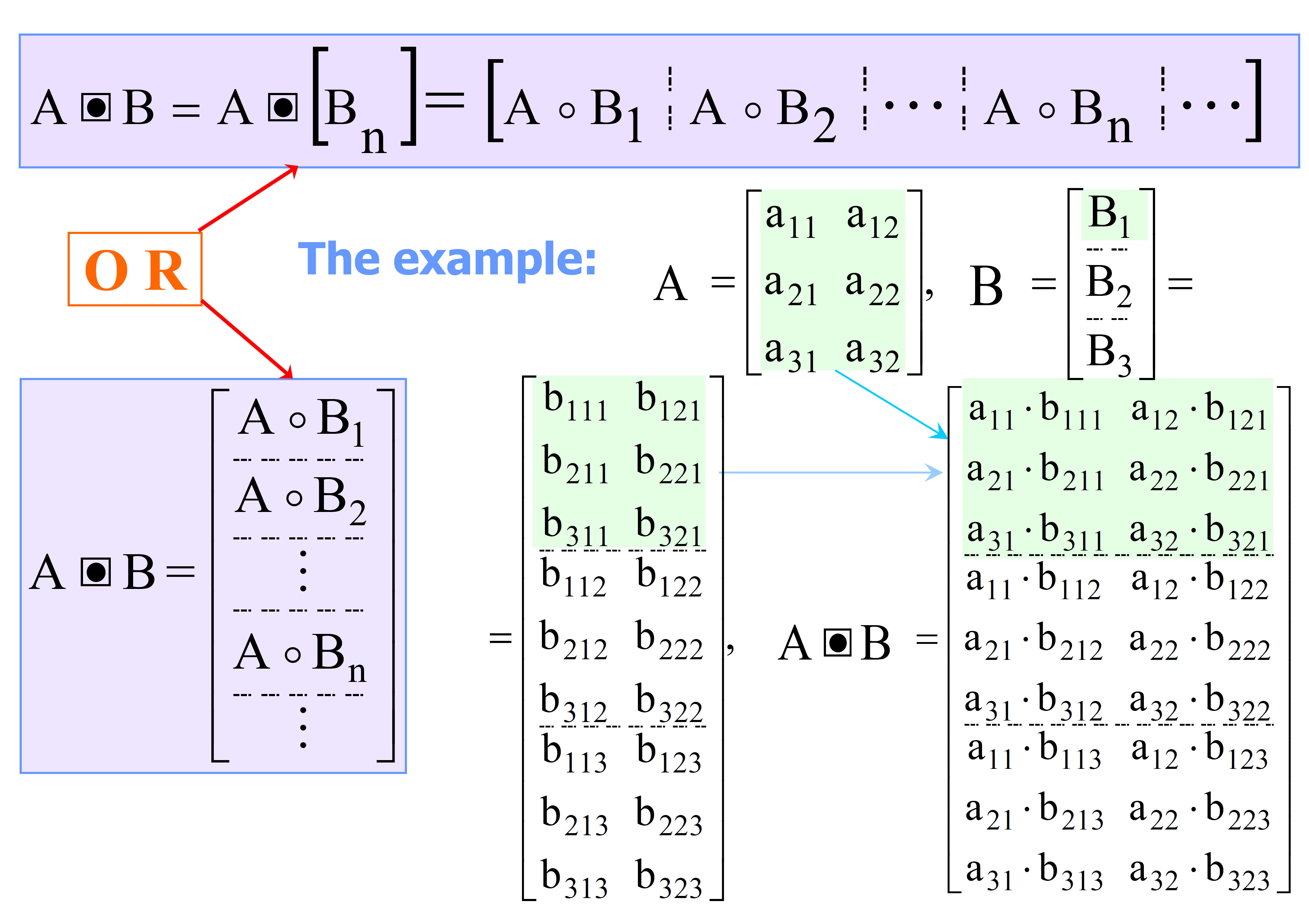
The Penetrating face product of matrices proposed by V. Slyusar in 1999

== See also ==
- Digital antenna array
- N-OFDM
- Face-splitting product of matrix
- Tensor random projections
