= Vladimir Varyukhin =

Vladimir Alekseevich Varyukhin
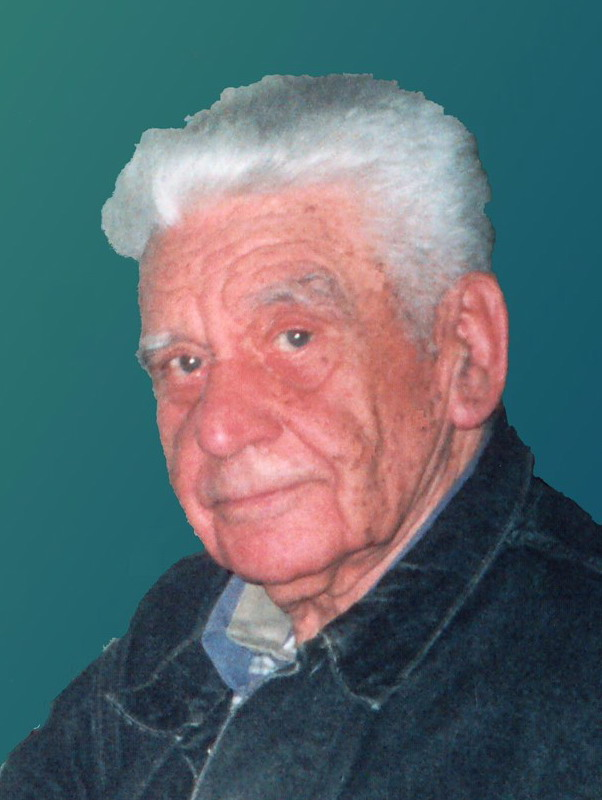
- Born: 14 December 1921; Ukrainian SSR, Soviet Union
- Died: July 8, 2007 (aged 85); Kyiv, Ukraine
- Known for: Digital antenna array
- Scientific career
- Fields: Antenna theory Radar signal processing

Vladimir Alekseevich Varyukhin (December 14, 1921 — July 8, 2007) was a Soviet and Ukrainian scientist, Professor, Doctor of Technical Sciences, Honored Scientist of the Ukrainian SSR, Major-General, founder of the theory of multichannel analysis, and creator of the scientific school on digital antenna arrays (DAAs).

== Scientific results ==
In 1962, he founded the well-known scientific school on multichannel analysis and digital antenna arrays. The theory of multichannel analysis that was developed by him considers the methods of determination of the angular coordinates of sources as functions of the angular distances between the sources and the phase and energy relations between signals and gives the basis for the functional schemes of units realizing the theoretical conclusions. The determination of the parameters of sources is carried on by the direct solution of systems of high-order transcendental equations describing the response function of a multichannel analyzer. In this case, the super-Rayleigh resolution of the sources of signals is ensured. The difficulties arising at the solution of the transcendental systems of high-order equations were overcome by V. A. Varyukhin by means of the “separation” of the unknowns, at which the determination of angular coordinates is reduced to the solution of algebraic equations, and the complex amplitudes are found by the solution of the linear systems of equations of the N-th order.

The Interdepartmental scientific-technical meeting organized in 1977 by the Scientific Council of the USSR Academy of Sciences on the problem “Statistical radiophysics” (Chairman — Academician Yuri Kobzarev) dated officially the start of the studies performed under the guidance of V. A. Varyukhin in the trend of digital antenna arrays by 1962 and recognized the priority of Varyukhin's scientific school in the development and practical realization of the theory of multichannel analysis.

In the subsequent years, V. A. Varyukhin supervised a number of theoretical works realized in several experimental radar stations with DAAs which were successfully tested on testing sites.

== Career Timeline ==
=== During World War II ===
27.09.1939 — 08.03.1942 — radio operator of the 2nd Red-Banner army of the Far-East front;

08.03.1942 — 05.08.1942 — commander of a radiostation of the 927-th separate signal battalion of the 96-th infantry division;

05.08.1942 — 11.01.1943 — commander of a radioplatoon, Stalingrad (Don) front;

11.01.1943 — 28.04.1943 — wound, medical treatment at the evacuation hospital No. 3755;

28.04.1943 — January 1944 — commander of a radioplatoon, Ural military district;

January 1944 — 12.04.1944 — commander of a radioplatoon, one of the Ukrainian fronts,

12.04.1944 — 10.07.1945 — commander of a radioplatoon (Soviet-American Operation Frantic);

=== After World War II ===
10.07.1945 — 23.05.1951 — listener of S. M. Budennyi Military Electrotechnical Academy of Communication (Leningrad);

23.05.1951 — 18.11.1961 — lecturer at the Military Command Academy of Communication and then at S. M. Budennyi Military Electrotechnical Academy of Communication (Leningrad);

27.11.1956 – defended the dissertation for a Candidate degree (Techn. Sci.) at the Council of S. M. Budennyi Military Red-Banner Engineering Academy of Communication. Since 18.11.1961, he served at Kiev Higher Air Defense Engineering School and then was the Head of a chair at A. M. Vasilevskii Military Academy of Air Defense of the Land Forces till 1981.

The significant stage of the recognition of Varyukhin's scientific results became the defense of the dissertation for a Doctoral degree (Techn. Sci.) in 1968. The distinctive feature of the theoretical trend developed by him is the maximal automatization of the process of estimation of the coordinates and the parameters of signals under conditions of their superresolution.

Professor — since 1972, Honored Scientist of the UkrSSR — 1979.

Since 1996 — work at the Academy of Armed Forces of Ukraine (Kyiv).

== Selected publications ==
- V. A. Varyuhin, S. A. Kas'yanyuk, “On a certain method for solving nonlinear systems of a special type”, Zh. Vychisl. Mat. Mat. Fiz., 6:2 (1966), 347–352; U.S.S.R. Comput. Math. Math. Phys., 6:2 (1966), 214–221
- V. A. Varyuhin, S. A. Kas'yanyuk, V. G. Finogenova, “A problem of constrained extremum for a class of functions representable by a Stieltyes integral”, Izv. Vyssh. Uchebn. Zaved. Matematika, 1966, 6 (55), 40–49.
- V. A. Varyuhin, S. A. Kas'yanyuk, “The effects of the fluctuations of the terms of a positive sequence on its canonical principal representations”, Zh. Vychisl. Mat. Mat. Fiz., 8:1 (1968), 169–173; U.S.S.R. Comput. Math. Math. Phys., 8:1 (1968), 230–236
- V. A. Varyuhin, S. A. Kas'yanyuk, “Iteration methods for sharpening the roots of equations”, Zh. Vychisl. Mat. Mat. Fiz., 9:3 (1969), 684–687; U.S.S.R. Comput. Math. Math. Phys., 9:3 (1969), 247–252
- V. A. Varyuhin, S. A. Kas'yanyuk, “The iteration methods of the solution of nonlinear systems”, Zh. Vychisl. Mat. Mat. Fiz., 10:6 (1970), 1533–1536; U.S.S.R. Comput. Math. Math. Phys., 10:6 (1970), 234–239
- V. A. Varyuhin, S. A. Kas'yanyuk, “A class of iterative procedures for the solution of systems of nonlinear equations”, Zh. Vychisl. Mat. Mat. Fiz., 17:5 (1977), 1123–1131; U.S.S.R. Comput. Math. Math. Phys., 17:5 (1977), 17–23
- V.A. Varyukhin, V.I. Pokrovskii, and V. F. Sakhno, “On the exactness of measurement of angular coordinates with antenna arrays,” Radiotekhn. Élektr., 1982.– Vol. 27, No. 11. – Pp. 2258 - 2260
- V. A. Varyuhin, V. I. Pokrovskii, V. F. Sakhno, “Modified likelihood function in the problem of the source angular coordinate determination using an antenna array”, Dokl. Akad. Nauk SSSR, No.270:5 (1983), 1092–1094
- V.A. Varyukhin, V.I. Pokrovskii, and V.F. Sakhno, “On the exactness of measurements of angular coordinates of several sources with the help of an antenna array,” Radiotekhn. Élektr., 1984.– Vol. 29, No. 4. – Pp. 660 – 665.
- R.S. Sudakov and V.A. Varyukhin, “Linear combinations of inverse matrices and the method of least squares,” in: Stochastic Models of Systems [in Russian], AS UkrSSR, Military Air Defense Academy, Kiev, 1986.
- V.A. Varyukhin, V.I. Pokrovskii, and V.F. Sakhno, “Quasisolutions of overdetermined incompatible systems,” in: Stochastic Models of Systems [in Russian], AS UkrSSR, Military Air Defense Academy, Kiev, 1986.
- V.A. Varyukhin, V.I. Pokrovskii, and V.F. Sakhno, “A modified likelihood function in the problems of multichannel analysis,” in: Stochastic Models of Systems [in Russian], AS UkrSSR, Military Air Defense Academy, Kiev, 1986
- V.A. Varyukhin, Fundamental Theory of Multichannel Analysis (VA PVO SV, Kyiv, 1993) [in Russian].
- Varyukhin, V.A. (2015). Foundations of the theory of multichannel analysis (in Russian). Kyiv: Naukova dumka. p. 168. ISBN 978-966-00-1466-4.

== Selected Awards ==
- Order of the Red Star
- Order of the Red Star
- Order of the Patriotic War, 1st class
- Order of the Patriotic War, 2nd class
- Medal "For Battle Merit"
- Medal "For the Victory over Germany in the Great Patriotic War 1941–1945"
- Order "For Service to the Homeland in the Armed Forces of the USSR", 3rd class

== Gallery ==
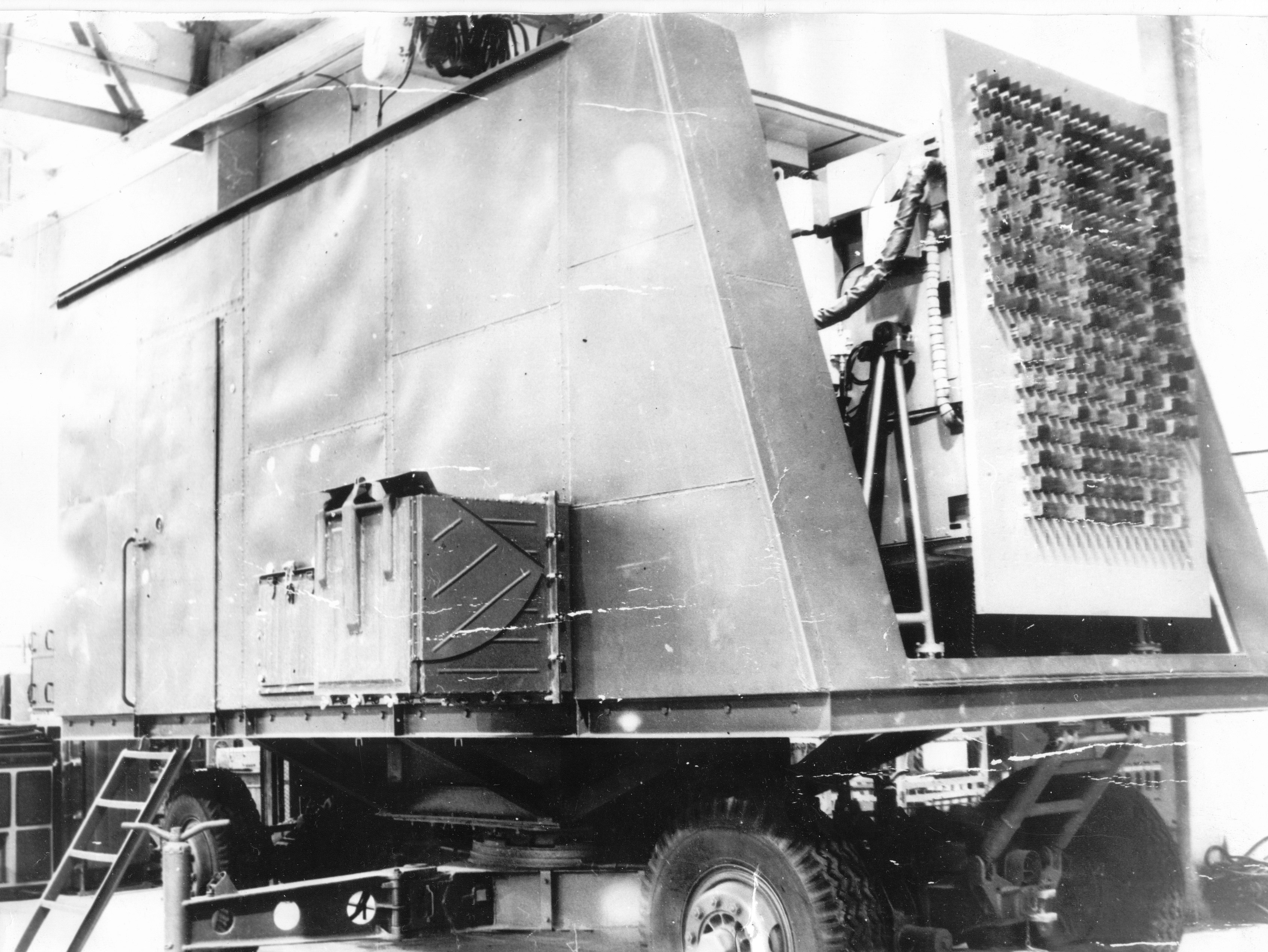
The experimental radar with 64-channels DAA (USSR, 1982)

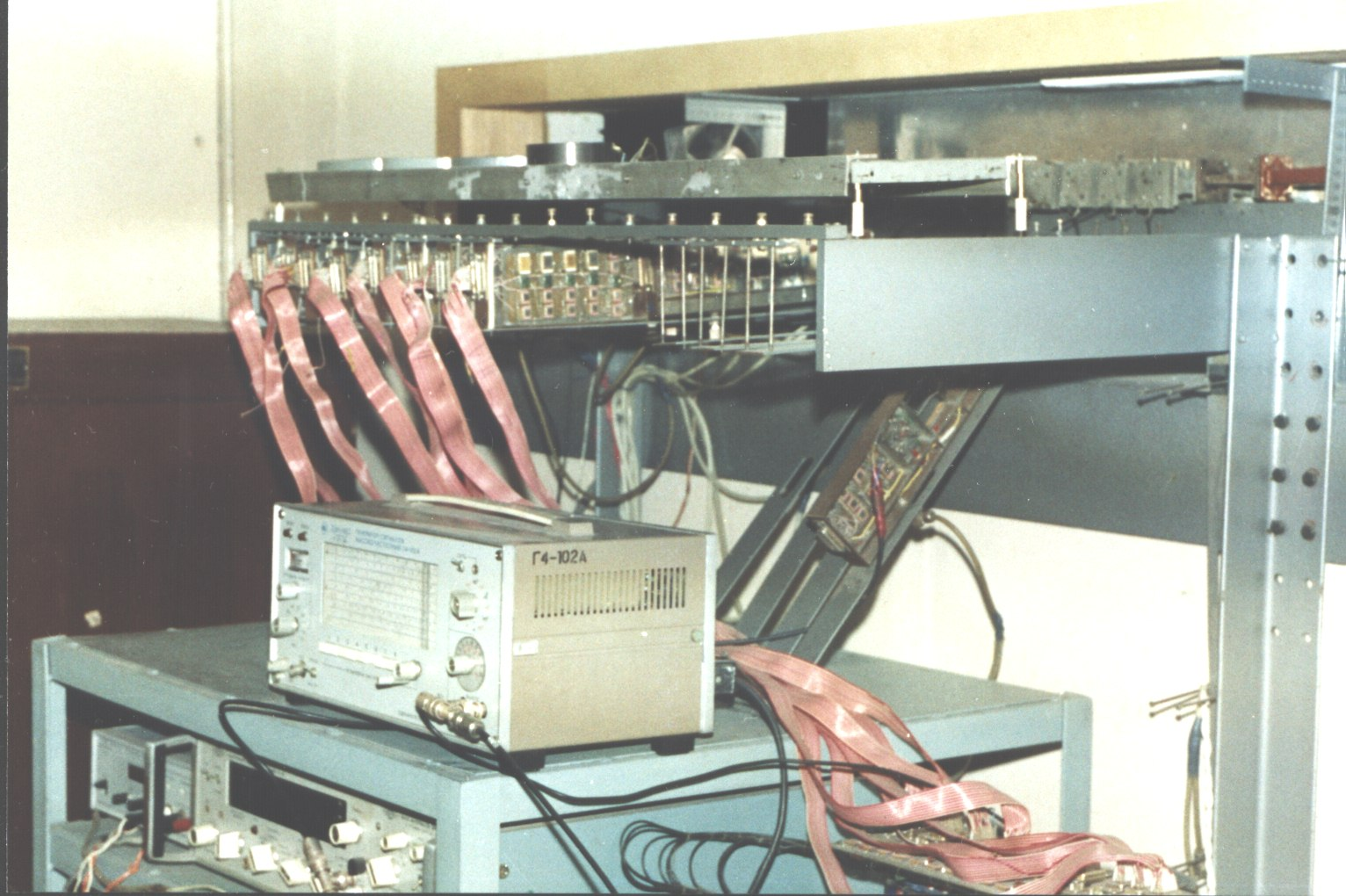
The technology demonstrator of 8-channels DAA (USSR, 1989)

== See also ==
- Digital antenna array
