= Mikhail Dratvin =

Soviet general (1897–1953)

- Born: 21 November 1897; Ekimovo, Russian Empire
- Died: 12 December 1953 (aged 56) Moscow, Soviet Union
- Allegiance: Russian Empire; Soviet Union
- Service years: 1916–1953
- Rank: Lieutenant general
- Conflicts: World War I; Russian Civil War; Kronstadt rebellion; Warlord Era China; Second Sino-Japanese War; World War II; Barvenkovo–Lozovaya Offensive
- Awards: Order of Lenin

Mikhail Dratvin (Russian: Михаил Иванович Дратвин; 21 November 1897, in Ekimovo – 12 December 1953, in Moscow) was a Soviet lieutenant general. Dratvin's military career began when he was drafted into the army of the Russian Empire during World War I. He subsequently became an expert in the fields of military intelligence and signals, teaching at a number of Soviet military academies and acting as a senior military advisor to the government of China during the Warlord Era and the Second Sino-Japanese War. He fought in World War II and served as a functionary of the Soviet Military Administration in Germany at the conclusion of the war.

== Early life ==
Mikhail Dratvin was born on 21 November 1897, in the village of Ekimovo, Galichsky District, Kostroma Oblast of the Russian Empire. In 1911, he graduated from a vocational school and subsequently worked in a Saint Petersburg telegraph company. In 1914, he acquired a telegraphist diploma.

== Military career ==
In 1916, he was drafted into the Russian army and fought in World War I as a functionary of the post–telegraph service. In 1918, he enlisted into the Red Army fighting in various campaigns of the Russian Civil War, including the suppression of the Kronstadt rebellion. At the conclusion of the war he was transferred into the intelligence branch of the army.

Between 1924 and 1926 he acted as a military advisor to the signal corps of the Chinese National Revolutionary Army in its struggles during the Warlord Era. In 1931, he graduated from the Frunze Military Academy. Between 1931 and 1935, he commanded the signal corps of the Moscow Military District. Between 1936 and 1937, he taught at the Military Academy of the General Staff of the Armed Forces of the Soviet Union. In August 1937, he was appointed rector of the Budyonny Military Academy of the Signal Corps. By November he had to leave his post a he was dispatched to China as a military advisor. At the time China was engaged in the Second Sino-Japanese War, receiving aid from both Germany and the Soviet Union. The May 1938 departure of Alexander von Falkenhausen mission of advisors marked the beginning of the end for the Sino-German cooperation. Komkor Dratvin thus became the most senior military advisor of Chiang Kai-shek, until he was replaced by Aleksandr Cherepanov in the June of the same year.

In 1939, Dratvin became the supervisor of 11th special department of the General Staff overseeing the recruitment of advisors for China and Spain. In December he became a functionary of the People's Defense Commissariat of U.S.S.R. In April 1941, he returned to the Military Academy of the General Staff as a staff member.

=== World War II ===
On 10 July 1941, he became the commander of the 275th Rifle Division. The 275th was formed at Novomoskovsk, part of the Odessa Military District. Its basic order of battle included the 980th, 982nd, and the 984th Rifle Regiments, as well as the 807th Artillery Regiment. As a result of the German advance, the division was relocated to Novorossiysk in the North Caucasus Military District while still incomplete around 7 August. In late August it was assigned to the Southern Front's 6th Army. The division fought in the Barvenkovo–Lozovaya Offensive in January 1942, after which it transferred to the 37th Army. On 11 January 1942, Dratvin became the deputy commander of the 37th Army (Soviet Union). On 1 September 1943, he was promoted to lieutenant general. From January until June 1945 he commanded the 47th Rifle Corps.

=== Post war ===
In June 1945, Dratvin became the deputy of the head of the Soviet Military Administration in Germany. In 1949, he became the head of the foreign relations department of the Main Intelligence Directorate. In January 1953, Dratvin became the deputy rector of the Military Diplomatic Academy in Moscow. Dratvin died on 12 December 1953 and was buried at the Novodevichy Cemetery. Throughout his career he received 4 Orders of the Red Banner, 3 Orders of Lenin, an Order of Kutuzov 2nd class, an Order of Suvorov as well as an Order of the Patriotic War 1st class.
