= Budyonny Military Academy of the Signal Corps =

USSR/Russia military university

Coordinates: 60°00′42.8″N 30°22′30.1″E

Military Academy of the Signal Corps, S. M. Budyonny
- Военная академия связи им. С. М. Буденного
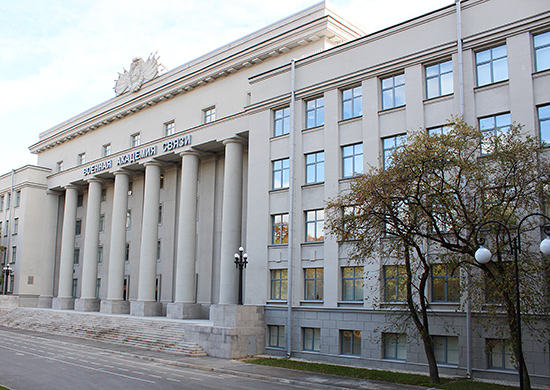
- Campus of the MAC, S.M. Budyonny
- Type: Military academy
- Established: 1919
- Rector: Major general S. V. Kostarev
- Students: more than 32,000 officers (national) more than 4,500 officers (international)
- Location: 194064, Saint Petersburg, Tichorezki prospect 3, Saint Petersburg, (Russia)
- Campus: Urban
- Website: vas.mil.ru

The S. M. Budyonny Military Academy of the Signal Corps is a military university in Saint Petersburg, Russia, founded in 1919. The academy trains officers for service in the Signal Troops of the Russian Ground Forces.

== History ==
- 1919 (8 November). Foundation of the academy. Initial name: Electro-technical high school for commanding officers of the workers' and peasants' Red Army (Russian: Высшая военная электротехническая школа комсостава Рабоче-крестьянской Красной Армии (РККА))
- 1941 (21 January). By order of the People’s Commissar of Defence of the USSR this military college was renamed to Military Academy of Signal Technology (Russian: Военная электротехническая академиа связи).
- 1946 (5 July). The Military academy received the name of honour S. M. Budyonny.
- 1998 (29 August). By decree №1009 of the Government of Russia the Military academy received the status of a Military university.

=== Awards ===
The military academy was many times distinguished and awarded as follows:

- November, 7th 1944 with the Order of the Red Banner
- February, 22nd 1968 with the Order of Lenin

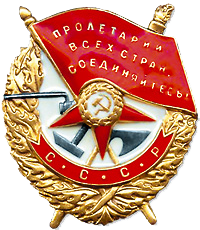
Order of the Red Banner, 1944

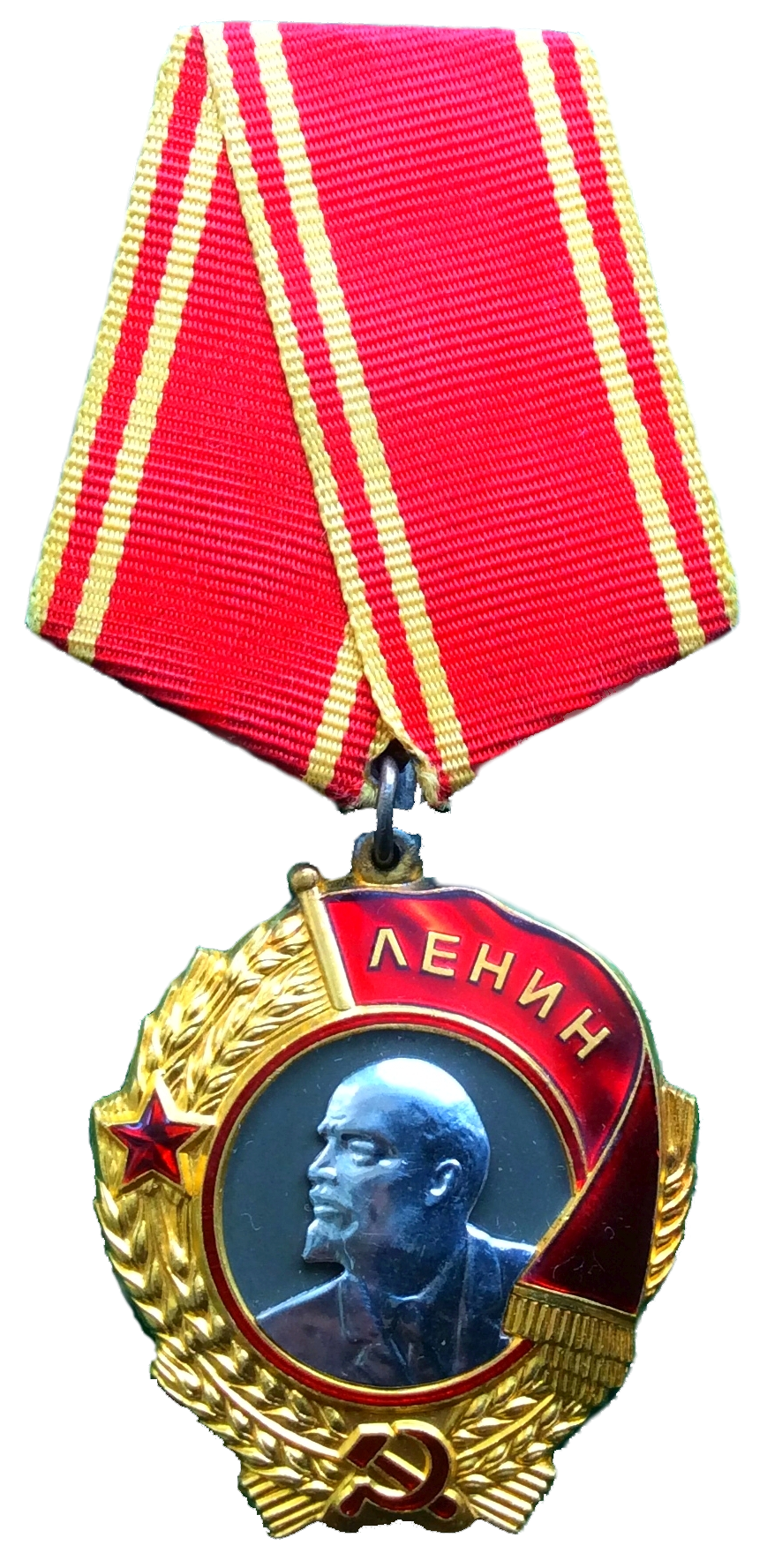
Order of Lenin, 1968

== Subjects / purpose of study ==
Academic qualification (university degree) for officers attached for special duties. Special subjects

- 210401 — Physics and communications technology of optoelectronics
- 210404 — Multichannel telecommunication’s systems
- 210405 — Radio engineering, broadcasting (BC) and television (TV)
- 210406 — Communications networks and electronic switching systems (ESS)
- 230101 — Computing technology, complex installations, systems and networks
- 230102 — IT-systems and automated command and control systems
- 230105 — Programming of computer systems and of automated systems

The duration of study is 5 years. Instruction takes place daily around the clock.

== Heads of the Academy ==
- 1919—1921 — A.V. Babinski (ru: А.В. Бабински)
- 1921—1922 — E.A. Bernardelli (ru: E.A. Бернарделли)
- 1922—1927 — A.A. Ovchinikov (ru: A.A Овчиников)
- 1928—1932 — Professor E.A. Svirsky (ru: E.A. Свирский)
- 1932—1937 — K.E. Polishchuk (ru: K.E. Полищук)
- 1937—1938 — M.I. Dratvin (ru: M.И. Дратвин)
- 1938—1938 — N.N. Andreyev (ru: H.H. Андреев)
- 1938—1942 — Lieutenant General V.M. Govyadkin (ru: B.M. Говядкин)
- 1942—1944 — Major General A.G. Lapkin (ru: A.Г. Лaпкин)
- 1944—1949 — Lieutenant General K.Kh. Muravyev (ru: К.Х. Муравьев)
- 1949—1951 — Lieutenant General P.D. Miroshnikov (ru: П.Д. Мирошников)
- 1951—1961 — Lieutenant General V.V. Zvenigorodsky (ru: B.B. Звенигородский)
- 1961—1974 — Colonel General A.A. Frolov (ru: А.А. Фролов)
- 1974—1978 — Lieutenant General A.P. Borisov (ru: А.П. Борисов)
- 1978—1988 — Lieutenant General N.G. Popov (ru: Н.Г. Попов)
- 1988—1991 — Lieutenant General P.N. Barashkov (ru: П.Н.Барашков)
- 1991—1995 — Lieutenant General G.G. Savin (ru: Г.Г. Савин)
- 1995—1998 — Lieutenant General S.P. Liguta (ru: С.Р. Лигута)
- 1998—2003 — Lieutenant General E.A. Karpov (ru: Е.А. Карпов)
- 2003—2009 — Lieutenant General A.L. Kremenchutsky (ru: А.Л. Кременчуцкий)
- 2009—2011 — Major General S.A. Budilkin (ru: С.А. Будилкин)
- 2011— ... — Major General S.V. Kostarev (ru: С.В. Костарев)

== Famous graduates and lecturers ==
- Vladimir Varyukhin - the listener (10.07.1945 — 23.05.1951) and the lecturer (23.05.1951 — 18.11.1961)
- Anatoly Dorofeyev (1920—2000), Hero of the Russian Federation. From April to October 1943 — student (intensive course) on the Command-Engineer-Faculty of the Military Academy of Signal Technology (at that time — evacuated to the town of Tomsk).

== See also ==
- Russian Signal Troops
