= Central Scientific Research Institute of Armament and Military Equipment of the Armed Forces of Ukraine =

Ukrainian military research institute

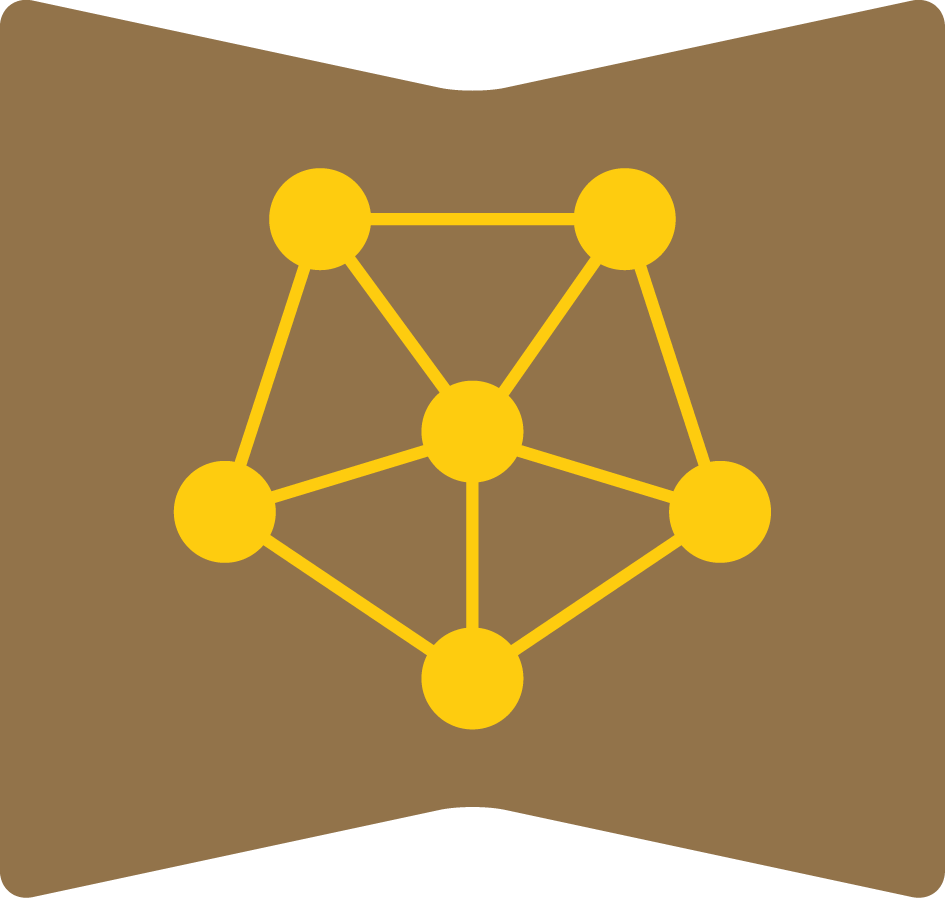
- Active: 1996 – present
- Country: Ukraine
- Branch: MOD of Ukraine
- Role: Research and development
- Garrison/HQ: Kyiv
- Website: https://cndiovt.com.ua/

Commanders
- Current commander: Major general Igor Chepkov

The Central Scientific Research Institute of Armament and Military Equipment of the Armed Forces of Ukraine is a research institution of the State-Customer of weapons and military equipment and carries out its activities conducting fundamental, exploratory and applied researchers.

== Main goals ==
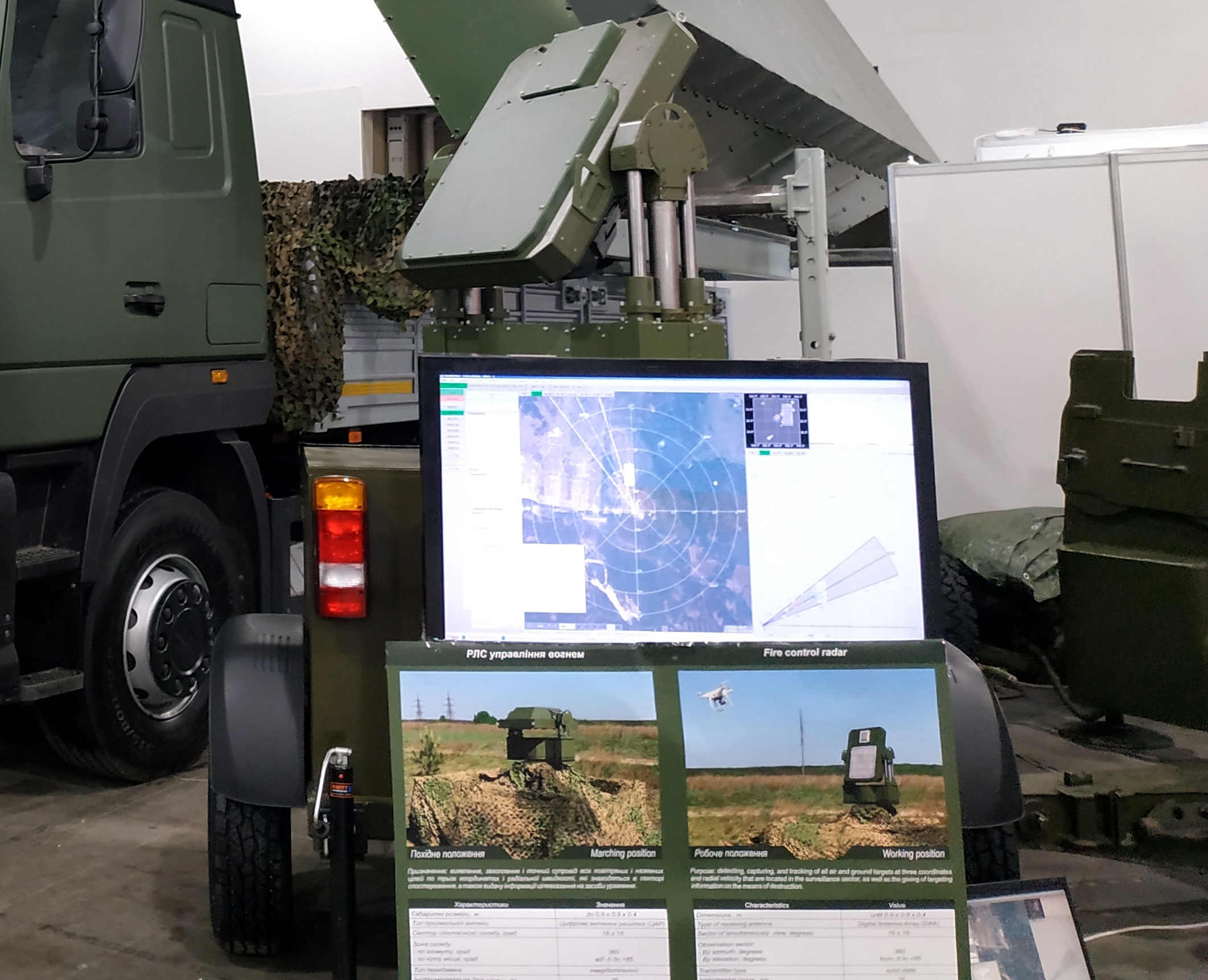

Its goals are to: establish military-technical policy in the field of development and modernization of weapons and military equipment; develop concepts and drafts of SWMEDP Programs for the development of weapons and military equipment and Annual MOD acquisition Plan; scientific and technical support of service life activities and disposal of weapons and military equipment; participate in international military and military-technical cooperation.

== Main activities ==
It runs the International Scientific and Practical Conference "Coordination problems of military-technical and defensive industrial policy in Ukraine. Weapons and Military equipment development perspectives" and other Scientific-Practical Conferences.

It publishes the Journal "Weapons and military equipment".

It is involved in NATO standardization and has cooperation with NATO Conference of National Armaments Directors, NATO Science and Technology Organisation, “Ukroboronprom” and leading Ukrainian universities like Kyiv Polytechnic Institute, Kharkiv Polytechnic, V. N. Karazin Kharkiv National University, ME Zhukovsky KAU, Kharkiv National University of Radio Electronics and I. Kozhedub Kharkiv University of Air Force.

== Literature ==
- В авангарді військово-технічної науки. - К.: ЦНДІ ОВТ ЗС України, 2017. - 260 p.
