= 275th Rifle Division =

- Active: 1st formation: July 1941 – December 1942; 2nd formation: July 1943 – late 1945
- Country: Soviet Union
- Branch: Red Army
- Type: Rifle division
- Engagements: World War II
- Battle honours: Khingan (2nd formation)

The 275th Rifle Division (Russian: 275-я стрелковая дивизия) was an infantry division of the Soviet Union's Red Army during World War II, formed twice.

The division was first formed in the summer of 1941 and was destroyed in the North Caucasus during the fall of 1942. It was reformed in July 1943 in the Soviet Far East, and fought in the Soviet invasion of Manchuria in August 1945, before being disbanded in late 1945.

== History ==
=== First Formation ===
The 275th began forming on 10 July 1941 at Novomoskovsk, part of the Odessa Military District. Its basic order of battle included the 980th, 982nd, and the 984th Rifle Regiments, as well as the 807th Artillery Regiment. As a result of the German advance, the division was relocated to Novorossiysk in the North Caucasus Military District while still incomplete around 7 August. In late August it was assigned to the Southern Front's 6th Army. The division fought in the Barvenkovo–Lozovaya Offensive in January 1942, after which it transferred to the 37th Army. The 37th Army positions were south of the Soviet defeat at the Second Battle of Kharkov in May, but the army was still forced to retreat into the North Caucasus by Case Blue, the German summer offensive, which began in June. By late July, the army's rifle divisions were down to only 500 to 800 riflemen remaining, and its remaining artillery and mortars had almost no ammunition. In mid-August, the division defended positions along the Baksan River. The 275th and its army subsequently defended positions along the Terek River, and by September the division had been reinforced enough that it could counterattack the 13th Panzer Division. On 25 October, a German attack, the final assault of the III Panzer Corps towards Ordzhonikidze, broke through the 37th Army, overrunning or surrounding most of its units. Although the attack was contained by reserves, the 275th had suffered heavy losses and as a result was disbanded on 20 December.

=== Second Formation ===
The 275th was reformed on 15 July 1943 in the Transbaikal Front, stationed in the Soviet Far East. It included the same regiments as the previous formations. The division became part of the 2nd Rifle Corps, and served with it for the entire war. In June 1945 the corps was assigned to the 36th Army, and from 9 August the division fought in the Soviet invasion of Manchuria. Along with the 86th Rifle Corps, the 2nd Rifle Corps was to encircle Hailar from the northeast, cut the Japanese retreat to Yakoshih, and defeat Japanese units in the Hailar Fortified Region. The division was part of the 36th Army's reserve, occupying positions behind the 2nd Rifle Corps, and was to support and reinforce the corps' advance if needed. On 13 August, the division was sent into combat to reinforce the forward detachment of the 205th Tank Brigade after Japanese resistance on the outskirts of the Yakoshih stiffened. The combined forces broke through the Japanese lines, forcing them to withdraw south towards the Wunuerh Fortified Region through a pass in the Greater Khingan mountains. At Wunuerh, the Japanese unsuccessfully tried to stop the advance of the 275th and the 205th, but were again driven back. The division received the honorific "Khingan" for its actions, and was disbanded in late 1945 as part of the Transbaikal-Amur Military District.

== Commanders ==
The following officers commanded the division's first formation:

- Major General Mikhail Dratvin (10 July 1941–11 January 1942)
- Colonel Alexander Pykhtin (12 January–20 September and 5 October–c. 20 December 1942)

The following officers commanded the division's second formation:

- Colonel Fyodor Panchekhin (15 July–15 December 1943)
- Colonel Konstantin Mayorov (16 December 1943–3 September 1945)
