= Bockstein homomorphism =

Homological map

In homological algebra, the Bockstein homomorphism, introduced by Meyer Bockstein (1942, 1943, 1958), is a connecting homomorphism associated with a short exact sequence

$$0 \to P \to Q \to R \to 0$$

of abelian groups, when they are introduced as coefficients into a chain complex C, and which appears in the homology groups as a homomorphism reducing degree by one,

$$\beta\colon H_i(C, R) \to H_{i-1}(C,P).$$

To be more precise, C should be a complex of free, or at least torsion-free, abelian groups, and the homology is of the complexes formed by tensor product with C (some flat module condition should enter). The construction of β is by the usual argument (snake lemma).

A similar construction applies to cohomology groups, this time increasing degree by one. Thus we have

$$\beta\colon H^i(C, R) \to H^{i+1}(C,P).$$

The Bockstein homomorphism $\beta$ associated to the coefficient sequence

$$0 \to \Z/p\Z\to \Z/p^2\Z\to \Z/p\Z\to  0$$

is used as one of the generators of the Steenrod algebra. This Bockstein homomorphism has the following two properties:

$$\beta\beta = 0$$,
$$\beta(a\cup b) = \beta(a)\cup b + (-1)^{\dim a} a\cup \beta(b)$$;

in other words, it is a superderivation acting on the cohomology mod p of a space.

== See also ==
- Bockstein spectral sequence
