= Algebraically compact group =

In mathematics, in the realm of abelian group theory, a group is said to be algebraically compact if it is a direct summand of every abelian group containing it as a pure subgroup.

Equivalent characterizations of algebraic compactness:

- The reduced part of the group is Hausdorff and complete in the $\mathbb{Z}$ adic topology.
- The group is pure injective, that is, injective with respect to exact sequences where the embedding is as a pure subgroup.

Relations with other properties:

- A torsion-free group is cotorsion if and only if it is algebraically compact.
- Every injective group is algebraically compact.
- Ulm factors of cotorsion groups are algebraically compact.
