= Universal coefficient theorem =

Establish relationships between homology and cohomology theories

In algebraic topology, universal coefficient theorems (UCT) establish relationships between homology groups (or cohomology groups) with different coefficients. For instance, for every topological space X, its integral homology groups:

$$H_i(X,\Z)$$

completely determine its homology groups with coefficients in A, for any abelian group A:

$$H_i(X,A)$$

Here $H_i$ might be the simplicial homology, or more generally the singular homology. The usual proof of this result is a pure piece of homological algebra about chain complexes of free abelian groups. The form of the result is that other coefficients A may be used, at the cost of using a Tor functor.

For example, it is common to take $A$ to be $\Z/2\Z$, so that coefficients are modulo 2. This becomes straightforward in the absence of 2-torsion in the homology. Quite generally, the result indicates the relationship that holds between the Betti numbers $b_i$ of $X$ and the Betti numbers $b_{i,F}$ with coefficients in a field $F$. These can differ, but only when the characteristic of $F$ is a prime number $p$ for which there is some $p$-torsion in the homology.

== Statement of the homology case ==
Consider the tensor product of modules $H_i(X,\Z)\otimes A$. The theorem states there is a short exact sequence involving the Tor functor

$$0 \to H_i(X, \Z)\otimes A \, \overset{\mu}\to \, H_i(X,A) \to \operatorname{Tor}_1(H_{i-1}(X, \Z),A)\to 0.$$

Furthermore, this sequence splits, though not naturally. Here $\mu$ is the map induced by the bilinear map $H_i(X,\Z)\times A\to H_i(X,A)$.

If the coefficient ring $A$ is $\Z/p\Z$, this is a special case of the Bockstein spectral sequence.

== Universal coefficient theorem for cohomology ==
Let $G$ be a module over a principal ideal domain $R$ (for example $\Z$, or any field.)

There is a universal coefficient theorem for cohomology involving the Ext functor, which asserts that there is a natural short exact sequence

$$0 \to \operatorname{Ext}_R^1(H_{i-1}(X; R), G) \to H^i(X; G) \, \overset{h} \to \, \operatorname{Hom}_R(H_i(X; R), G)\to 0.$$

As in the homology case, the sequence splits, though not naturally. In fact, suppose

$$H_i(X;G) = \ker \partial_i \otimes G / \operatorname{im}\partial_{i+1} \otimes G,$$

and define

$$H^*(X; G) = \ker(\operatorname{Hom}(\partial, G)) / \operatorname{im}(\operatorname{Hom}(\partial, G)).$$

Then $h$ above is the canonical map:

$$h([f])([x]) = f(x).$$

An alternative point of view can be based on representing cohomology via Eilenberg–MacLane space, where the map $h$ takes a homotopy class of maps $X\to K(G,i)$ to the corresponding homomorphism induced in homology. Thus, the Eilenberg–MacLane space is a weak right adjoint to the homology functor.

== Example: mod 2 cohomology of the real projective space ==
Let $X=\mathbb{RP}^n$, the real projective space. We compute the singular cohomology of $X$ with coefficients in $G=\Z/2\Z$ using integral homology, i.e., $R=\Z$.

Knowing that the integer homology is given by:

$$H_i(X; \Z) =
\begin{cases}
\Z & i = 0 \text{ or } i = n \text{ odd,}\\
\Z/2\Z & 0<i<n,\ i\ \text{odd,}\\
0 & \text{otherwise.}
\end{cases}$$

We have $\operatorname{Ext}(G,G)=G$ and $\operatorname{Ext}(R,G)=0$, so that the above exact sequences yield

$$H^i (X; G) = G$$

for all $i=0,\dots,n$. In fact the total cohomology ring structure is

$$H^*(X; G) = G [w] / \left \langle w^{n+1} \right \rangle.$$

== Corollaries ==
A special case of the theorem is computing integral cohomology. For a finite CW complex $X$, $H_i(X,\Z)$ is finitely generated, and so we have the following decomposition.

$$H_i(X; \Z) \cong \Z^{\beta_i(X)}\oplus T_{i},$$

where $\beta_i(X)$ are the Betti numbers of $X$ and $T_i$ is the torsion part of $H_i$. One may check that

$$\operatorname{Hom}(H_i(X),\Z) \cong \operatorname{Hom}(\Z^{\beta_i(X)},\Z) \oplus \operatorname{Hom}(T_i, \Z) \cong \Z^{\beta_i(X)},$$

and

$$\operatorname{Ext}(H_i(X),\Z) \cong \operatorname{Ext}(\Z^{\beta_i(X)},\Z) \oplus \operatorname{Ext}(T_i, \Z) \cong T_i.$$

This gives the following statement for integral cohomology:

$$H^i(X;\Z) \cong \Z^{\beta_i(X)} \oplus T_{i-1}.$$

For $X$ an orientable, closed, and connected $n$-manifold, this corollary coupled with Poincaré duality gives that $\beta_i(X)=\beta_{n-i}(X)$.

== Universal coefficient spectral sequence ==
There is a generalization of the universal coefficient theorem for (co)homology with twisted coefficients.

For cohomology we have

$$E^{p,q}_2=\operatorname{Ext}_{R}^q(H_p(C_*),G)\Rightarrow H^{p+q}(C_*;G),$$

where $R$ is a ring with unit, $C_*$ is a chain complex of free modules over $R$, $G$ is any $(R,S)$-bimodule for some ring with a unit $S$, and $\operatorname{Ext}$ is the Ext group. The differential $d^r$ has degree $(1-r,r)$.

Similarly for homology,

$$E_{p,q}^2=\operatorname{Tor}^{R}_q(H_p(C_*),G)\Rightarrow H_*(C_*;G),$$

for $\operatorname{Tor}$ the Tor group and the differential $d_r$ having degree $(r-1,-r)$.
