= Basic subgroup =

In abstract algebra, a basic subgroup is a subgroup of an abelian group which is a direct sum of cyclic subgroups and satisfies further technical conditions. This notion was introduced by L. Ya. Kulikov (for p-groups) and by László Fuchs (in general) in an attempt to formulate classification theory of infinite abelian groups that goes beyond the Prüfer theorems. It helps to reduce the classification problem to classification of possible extensions between two well understood classes of abelian groups: direct sums of cyclic groups and divisible groups.

== Definition and properties ==
A subgroup, B, of an abelian group, A, is called p-basic, for a fixed prime number, p, if the following conditions hold:

1. B is a direct sum of cyclic groups of order p^{n} and infinite cyclic groups;
2. B is a p-pure subgroup of A;
3. The quotient group, A/B, is a p-divisible group.

Conditions 1–3 imply that the subgroup, B, is Hausdorff in the p-adic topology of B, which moreover coincides with the topology induced from A, and that B is dense in A. Picking a generator in each cyclic direct summand of B creates a p-basis of B, which is analogous to a basis of a vector space or a free abelian group.

Every abelian group, A, contains p-basic subgroups for each p, and any 2 p-basic subgroups of A are isomorphic. Abelian groups that contain a unique p-basic subgroup have been completely characterized. For the case of p-groups they are either divisible or bounded; i.e., have bounded exponent. In general, the isomorphism class of the quotient, A/B by a basic subgroup, B, may depend on B.
