= Primary cyclic group =

Type of group in mathematics

In mathematics, a primary cyclic group is a group that is both a cyclic group and a p-primary group for some prime number p. That is, it is a cyclic group of order p^{m}, C_{p^{m}}, for some prime number p, and natural number m.

Every finite abelian group G may be written as a finite direct sum of primary cyclic groups, as stated in the fundamental theorem of finite abelian groups:

$G=\bigoplus_{1\leq i \leq n}\mathrm{C}_{{p_i}^{m_i}} .$

This expression is essentially unique: there is a bijection between the sets of groups in two such expressions, which maps each group to one that is isomorphic.

Primary cyclic groups are characterised among finitely generated abelian groups as the torsion groups that cannot be expressed as a direct sum of two non-trivial groups. As such they, along with the group of integers, form the building blocks of finitely generated abelian groups.

The subgroups of a primary cyclic group are linearly ordered by inclusion. The only other groups that have this property are the quasicyclic groups.
