= Torsion abelian group =

In abstract algebra, a torsion abelian group is an abelian group in which every element has finite order. For example, the torsion subgroup of an abelian group is a torsion abelian group.

== Examples ==
=== Finite Cyclic ===
A finite cyclic group is a torsion abelian group.

=== Finitely Generated Abelian Group ===
A finitely generated abelian group is torsion iff it is finite, see Finitely generated abelian group#Classification

=== Infinite Torsion Abelian Group ===
A torsion abelian group is not necessarily finite. For instance, the group $\Q$/ $\Z$

== See also ==
- Betti number
