= Cotorsion group =

In abelian group theory, an abelian group is said to be cotorsion if any extension of it by a torsion-free abelian group splits. If the group is $M$, this says that the Ext-group $\operatorname{Ext}_\mathbb{Z}(F,M)$ is zero for all torsion-free groups $F$. Since any such $F$ embeds into a direct sum of copies of $\mathbb{Q}$, it suffices to check the condition on the group of rational numbers.

Every divisible group or injective group (in particular the group of rational numbers $\mathbb{Q}$) is cotorsion. For any two abelian groups $A$ and $B$, the group of extensions $\operatorname{Ext}_\mathbb{Z}(A,B)$ is cotorsion.

== Properties of cotorsion groups ==
The class of cotorsion groups is closed under extensions, direct products, and quotients.

A countable cotorsion group is a direct sum of a divisible group and a bounded group, that is a group of bounded exponent.

The Baer--Fomin Theorem states that a torsion group is cotorsion if and only if it is a direct sum of a divisible group and a bounded group.

A torsion-free abelian group is cotorsion if and only if it is algebraically compact. Such groups are precisely the direct summands of direct products of $p$-adic integers.

Ulm subgroups of cotorsion groups are cotorsion and Ulm factors of cotorsion groups are algebraically compact.

== In ring theory ==
A right module M over a ring R is said to be a cotorsion module if $\operatorname{Ext}^1_R(F,M)=0$ for all flat (right) modules F. When $R$ is the ring of integers $\mathbb{Z}$, this reduces to the previous definition of cotorsion abelian groups.

The ring $R$ is said to be (right) cotorsion if the regular module $R_R$ is cotorsion.
