= Torsion subgroup =

Subgroup of an abelian group consisting of all elements of finite order

In the theory of abelian groups, the torsion subgroup $A_T$ of an abelian group $A$ is the subgroup of $A$ consisting of all elements that have finite order (the torsion elements of $A$). An abelian group $A$ is called a torsion group (or periodic group) if every element of $A$ has finite order and is called torsion-free if every element of $A$ except the identity is of infinite order.

The proof that $A_T$ is closed under the group operation relies on the commutativity of the operation (see examples section).

If $A$ is abelian, then the torsion subgroup $T$ is a fully characteristic subgroup of $A$ and the factor group $A/T$ is torsion-free. There is a covariant functor from the category of abelian groups to the category of torsion groups that sends every group to its torsion subgroup and every homomorphism to its restriction to the torsion subgroup. There is another covariant functor from the category of abelian groups to the category of torsion-free groups that sends every group to its quotient by its torsion subgroup, and sends every homomorphism to the obvious induced homomorphism (which is easily seen to be well-defined).

If $A$ is finitely generated and abelian, then it can be written as the direct sum of its torsion subgroup $T$ and a torsion-free subgroup (but this is not true for all infinitely generated abelian groups). In any decomposition of $A$ as a direct sum of a torsion subgroup $S$ and a torsion-free subgroup, $S$ must equal $T$ (but the torsion-free subgroup is not uniquely determined). This is a key step in the classification of finitely generated abelian groups.

== $p$-power torsion subgroups ==
For any abelian group $(A, +)$ and any prime number $p$ the set $A_{T_p}$ of elements of $A$ that have order a power of $p$ is a subgroup called the $p$-power torsion subgroup or, more loosely, the $p$-torsion subgroup:

$$A_{T_p}=\{a\in A \;|\; \exists n\in \mathbb{N}\;, p^n a = 0\}.\;$$

The torsion subgroup $A_T$ is isomorphic to the direct sum of its $p$-power torsion subgroups over all prime numbers $p$:

$$A_T \cong \bigoplus_{p\in P} A_{T_p}.\;$$

When $A$ is a finite abelian group, $A_{T_p}$ coincides with the unique Sylow $p$-subgroup of $A$.

Each $p$-power torsion subgroup of $A$ is a fully characteristic subgroup. More strongly, any homomorphism between abelian groups sends each $p$-power torsion subgroup into the corresponding $p$-power torsion subgroup.

For each prime number $p$, this provides a functor from the category of abelian groups to the category of $p$-power torsion groups that sends every group to its $p$-power torsion subgroup, and restricts every homomorphism to the $p$-torsion subgroups. The product over the set of all prime numbers of the restriction of these functors to the category of torsion groups, is a faithful functor from the category of torsion groups to the product over all prime numbers of the categories of $p$-torsion groups. In a sense, this means that studying $p$-torsion groups in isolation tells us everything about torsion groups in general.

== Examples and further results ==
The 4-torsion subgroup of the quotient group of the complex numbers under addition by a lattice.

- The torsion subset of a non-abelian group is not, in general, a subgroup. For example, in the infinite dihedral group, which has presentation

$$\langle x,y \mid x^2=y^2=1 \rangle$$,
the element $xy$ is a product of two torsion elements, but has infinite order.

- The torsion elements in a nilpotent group form a normal subgroup.
- Every finite abelian group is a torsion group. Not every torsion group is finite however: consider the direct sum of a countable number of copies of the cyclic group $C_2$; this is a torsion group since every element has order 2. Nor need there be an upper bound on the orders of elements in a torsion group if it isn't finitely generated, as the example of the factor group $\mathbb{Q}/\mathbb{Z}$ shows.
- Every free abelian group is torsion-free, but the converse is not true, as is shown by the additive group of the rational numbers $\mathbb{Q}$.
- Even if $A$ is not finitely generated, the size of its torsion-free part is uniquely determined, as is explained in more detail in the article on rank of an abelian group.
- An abelian group $A$ is torsion-free if and only if it is flat as a $\Z$-module, which means that whenever $C$ is a subgroup of some abelian group $B$, then the natural map from the tensor product $C\otimes A\to B\otimes A$ is injective.
- Tensoring an abelian group $A$ with $\mathbb{Q}$ (or any divisible group) kills torsion. That is, if $T$ is a torsion group then $T\otimes\mathbb{Q}=0$. For a general abelian group $A$ with torsion subgroup $T$ one has $A\otimes\mathbb{Q}\cong A/T\otimes\mathbb{Q}$.
- Taking the torsion subgroup makes torsion abelian groups into a coreflective subcategory of abelian groups, while taking the quotient by the torsion subgroup makes torsion-free abelian groups into a reflective subcategory.

== See also ==
- Torsion (algebra)
- Torsion-free abelian group
- Torsion abelian group
