= Idempotent monad =

In category theory, an idempotent monad is, roughly speaking, a monad that theorizes a reflective subcategory.

== Definition ==
Let $(T,\eta,\mu)$ be a monad on a category $\mathcal C$. Then the following conditions are equivalent.

- The monad binary operation $\mu\colon TT\Rightarrow T$ is a natural isomorphism.
- The forgetful functor
  $$\begin{array}{l}
\mathcal C_T\to\mathcal C \\
(A,e)\mapsto A \\
(f\colon(A,e)\to(A',e'))\mapsto(f\colon A\to A')
\end{array}$$
  for the Eilenberg–Moore category is full and faithful.
- For every $T$-algebra $(A,e)$ the morphism $e\colon TA\to A$ is an isomorphism.

Such a monad is called an idempotent monad.

== Properties ==
The notion of the idempotent monads is equivalent to that of the reflective subcategories. Given an idempotent monad on a category $\mathcal C$, the forgetful functor

$$\mathcal C_T\to\mathcal C$$

from the Eilenberg–Moore category $\mathcal C_T$ to $\mathcal C$ is full and faithful. Conversely, every full and faithful right adjoint $I\colon\mathcal D\to\mathcal C$ is monadic and its corresponding monad

$$(I\circ R,\eta,I\circ\epsilon\circ R)$$

is idempotent.

=== Idempotent monads associated with monads ===
Let $\operatorname{Monad}(\mathcal C)$ denote the category of monads on a category $\mathcal C$ and their morphisms. Let $\operatorname{IdemMonad}(\mathcal C)$ denote the full subcategory of idempotnet monads. For a complete well-powered category $\mathcal C$, the inclusion functor

$$\operatorname{IdemMonad}(\mathcal C)\hookrightarrow\operatorname{Monad}(\mathcal C)$$

admits a right adjoint.
