= Meyer Bockstein =

Russian topologist

Meyer Bockstein (also Меер Феликсович Бокштейн or Meer Feliksovich Bokshtein or Bokstein) (4 October 1913 to 2 May 1990) was a topologist from Moscow who introduced the Bockstein homomorphism. The Bockstein spectral sequence is named after him.
