= Torsion (algebra) =

Zero divisors in a module

In mathematics, specifically in ring theory, a torsion element is an element of a module that yields zero when multiplied by some non-zero-divisor of the ring. The torsion submodule of a module is the submodule formed by the torsion elements (in cases when this is indeed a submodule, such as when the ring is an integral domain). A torsion module is a module consisting entirely of torsion elements. A module is torsion-free if its only torsion element is the zero element.

This terminology is more commonly used for modules over a domain, that is, when the regular elements of the ring are all its nonzero elements.

This terminology applies to abelian groups (with "module" and "submodule" replaced by "group" and "subgroup"). This is just a special case of the more general situation, because abelian groups are modules over the ring of integers. (In fact, this is the origin of the terminology, which was introduced for abelian groups before being generalized to modules.)

In the case of groups that are noncommutative, a torsion element is an element of finite order. Contrary to the commutative case, the torsion elements do not form a subgroup, in general.

== Definition ==
An element m of a module M over a ring R is called a torsion element of the module if there exists a regular element r of the ring (an element that is neither a left nor a right zero divisor) that annihilates m, i.e., r m = 0. In an integral domain (a commutative ring without zero divisors), every non-zero element is regular, so a torsion element of a module over an integral domain is one annihilated by a non-zero element of the integral domain. Some authors use this as the definition of a torsion element, but this definition does not work well over more general rings.

A module M over a ring R is called a torsion module if all its elements are torsion elements, and torsion-free if zero is the only torsion element. If the ring R is commutative then the set of all torsion elements forms a submodule of M, called the torsion submodule of M, sometimes denoted T(M). If R is not commutative, T(M) may or may not be a submodule. It is shown in (Lam 2007) that R is a right Ore ring if and only if T(M) is a submodule of M for all right R-modules. Since right Noetherian domains are Ore, this covers the case when R is a right Noetherian domain (which might not be commutative).

More generally, let M be a module over a ring R and S be a multiplicatively closed subset of R. An element m of M is called an S-torsion element if there exists an element s in S such that s annihilates m, i.e., s m = 0. In particular, one can take for S the set of regular elements of the ring R and recover the definition above.

An element g of a group G is called a torsion element of the group if it has finite order, i.e., if there is a positive integer m such that g^{m} = e, where e denotes the identity element of the group, and g^{m} denotes the product of m copies of g. A group is called a torsion (or periodic) group if all its elements are torsion elements, and a torsion-free group if its only torsion element is the identity element. Any abelian group may be viewed as a module over the ring Z of integers, and in this case the two notions of torsion coincide.

== Examples ==
1. Let M be a free module over any ring R. Then it follows immediately from the definitions that M is torsion-free (if the ring R is not a domain then torsion is considered with respect to the set S of non-zero-divisors of R). In particular, any free abelian group is torsion-free and any vector space over a field K is torsion-free when viewed as a module over K.
2. By contrast with example 1, any finite group (abelian or not) is periodic and finitely generated. Burnside's problem, conversely, asks whether a finitely generated periodic group must be finite. The answer is "no" in general, even if the period is fixed.
3. The torsion elements of the multiplicative group of a field are its roots of unity.
4. In the modular group, Γ obtained from the group SL(2, Z) of 2×2 integer matrices with unit determinant by factoring out its center, any nontrivial torsion element either has order two and is conjugate to the element S or has order three and is conjugate to the element ST. In this case, torsion elements do not form a subgroup, for example, S · ST = T, which has infinite order.
5. The abelian group Q/Z, consisting of the rational numbers modulo 1, is periodic, i.e. every element has finite order. Analogously, the module K(t)/K[t] over the ring R = K[t] of polynomials in one variable is pure torsion. Both these examples can be generalized as follows: if R is an integral domain and Q is its field of fractions, then Q/R is a torsion R-module.
6. The torsion subgroup of (R/Z, +) is (Q/Z, +) while the groups (R, +) and (Z, +) are torsion-free. The quotient of a torsion-free abelian group by a subgroup is torsion-free exactly when the subgroup is a pure subgroup.
7. Consider a linear operator L acting on a finite-dimensional vector space V over the field K. If we view V as an K[L]-module in the natural way, then (as a result of many things, either simply by finite-dimensionality or as a consequence of the Cayley–Hamilton theorem), V is a torsion K[L]-module.

== Case of a principal ideal domain ==
Suppose that R is a (commutative) principal ideal domain and M is a finitely generated R-module. Then the structure theorem for finitely generated modules over a principal ideal domain gives a detailed description of the module M up to isomorphism. In particular, it claims that

$$M \simeq F\oplus \mathrm T(M),$$

where F is a free R-module of finite rank (depending only on M) and T(M) is the torsion submodule of M. As a corollary, any finitely generated torsion-free module over R is free. This corollary does not hold for more general commutative domains, even for R = K[x,y], the ring of polynomials in two variables. For non-finitely generated modules, the above direct decomposition is not true. The torsion subgroup of an abelian group may not be a direct summand of it.

== Torsion and localization ==
Assume that R is a commutative domain and M is an R-module. Let Q be the field of fractions of the ring R. Then one can consider the Q-module

$$M_Q = M \otimes_R Q,$$

obtained from M by extension of scalars. Since Q is a field, a module over Q is a vector space, possibly infinite-dimensional. There is a canonical homomorphism of abelian groups from M to M_{Q}, and the kernel of this homomorphism is precisely the torsion submodule T(M). More generally, if S is a multiplicatively closed subset of the ring R, then we may consider localization of the R-module M,

$$M_S = M \otimes_R R_S,$$

which is a module over the localization R_{S}. There is a canonical map from M to M_{S}, whose kernel is precisely the S-torsion submodule of M. Thus the torsion submodule of M can be interpreted as the set of the elements that "vanish in the localization". The same interpretation continues to hold in the non-commutative setting for rings satisfying the Ore condition, or more generally for any right denominator set S and right R-module M.

== Torsion in homological algebra ==
The concept of torsion plays an important role in homological algebra. If M and N are two modules over a commutative domain R (for example, two abelian groups, when R = Z), Tor functors yield a family of R-modules Tor_{i}(M,N). The S-torsion of an R-module M is canonically isomorphic to Tor^{R}_{1}(M, R_{S}/R) by the exact sequence of Tor^{R}_{*}: The short exact sequence $0\to R\to R_S \to R_S/R \to 0$ of R-modules yields an exact sequence $0\to\operatorname{Tor}^R_1(M, R_S/R)\to M\to M_S$, and hence $\operatorname{Tor}^R_1(M, R_S/R)$ is the kernel of the localisation map of M. The symbol Tor denoting the functors reflects this relation with the algebraic torsion. This same result holds for non-commutative rings as well as long as the set S is a right denominator set.

== Abelian varieties ==
The 4-torsion subgroup of an elliptic curve over the complex numbers.

The torsion elements of an abelian variety are torsion points or, in an older terminology, division points. On elliptic curves they may be computed in terms of division polynomials.

== See also ==
- Analytic torsion
- Arithmetic dynamics
- Flat module
- Annihilator (ring theory)
- Localization of a module
- Rank of an abelian group
- Ray–Singer torsion
- Torsion-free abelian group
- Universal coefficient theorem

== Sources ==
- Ernst Kunz, "Introduction to Commutative algebra and algebraic geometry", Birkhauser 1985, ISBN 0-8176-3065-1
- Irving Kaplansky, "Infinite abelian groups", University of Michigan, 1954.
- Michiel Hazewinkel (2001) [1994], "Torsion submodule", Encyclopedia of Mathematics, EMS Press
- Lam, Tsit Yuen (2007), Exercises in modules and rings, Problem Books in Mathematics, New York: Springer, pp. xviii+412, doi:10.1007/978-0-387-48899-8, ISBN 978-0-387-98850-4, MR 2278849
- Roman, Stephen (2008), Advanced Linear Algebra, Graduate Texts in Mathematics (Third ed.), Springer, p. 446, ISBN 978-0-387-72828-5.
