= Reflective subcategory =

Mathematical concept in category theory

In mathematics, a reflective subcategory of a category $\mathcal{C}$ is a full subcategory $\mathcal{D}$ whose inclusion functor $\mathcal{D} \hookrightarrow \mathcal{C}$ has a left adjoint, called the reflector (or localization). Dually, a coreflective subcategory is a full subcategory whose inclusion functor has a right adjoint, the coreflector.

Informally, $\mathcal{D}$ is reflective when every object of $\mathcal{C}$ can be approximated by an object of $\mathcal{D}$ without losing information about morphisms to objects of $\mathcal{D}$.

== Definition ==
A reflection of an object of a category $\mathcal{C}$ in a full subcategory $\mathcal{D}$ consists of an object $R(A)$ of $\mathcal{D}$ equipped with a reflection morphism $\eta_A : A \to R(A)$ having the following universal property: for every object $B$ of $\mathcal{D}$ and every morphism $f : A \to B$, there exists a unique morphism $\overline{f} : R(A) \to B$ (in $\mathcal{C}$, or equivalently in $\mathcal{D}$ since it is full) such that $f = \overline{f} \circ \eta_A$, as displayed in the following commutative diagram:

This characterizes the pair of $R(A)$ and $\eta_A$ up to isomorphism.

When every object of $\mathcal{C}$ has a reflection in $\mathcal{D}$, this full subcategory is said to be reflective.

Reflection is then functorial: a morphism $f : A \to B$ induces a morphism $R(f) : R(A) \to R(B)$ defined as the unique factorization of $\eta_B \circ f$ through $\eta_A$.

The functor $R : \mathcal{D} \to \mathcal{C}$ is called the reflector, and it is left adjoint to the inclusion functor $\mathcal{D} \hookrightarrow \mathcal{C}$.

Conversely, if the inclusion functor has a left adjoint $R$, then each object $A$ of $\mathcal{C}$ has a reflection consisting of the object $R(A)$ of $\mathcal{D}$ with the morphism $\eta_A : A \to R(A)$, where $\eta$ is the unit of the adjunction. Hence, a reflective subcategory is equivalently a full subcategory whose inclusion functor has a left adjoint.

Dually, a full subcategory $\mathcal{D}$ of $\mathcal{C}$ is coreflective when every object $A \in \mathcal{C}$ has a coreflection, namely an object $L(A) \in \mathcal{D}$ with a morphism $\epsilon_A : L(A) \to A$ such that every morphism $B \to A$ where $B \in \mathcal{D}$ uniquely factors through $\epsilon_A$, and this is equivalent to the inclusion functor $\mathcal{D} \hookrightarrow \mathcal{C}$ having a right adjoint $L$, the coreflector.

== Examples ==
=== Algebra ===
- The category of abelian groups Ab is a reflective subcategory of the category of groups, Grp. The reflector is the functor that sends each group to its abelianization. In its turn, the category of groups is a reflective subcategory of the category of inverse semigroups.
- Similarly, the category of commutative associative algebras is a reflective subcategory of all associative algebras, where the reflector is quotienting out by the commutator ideal. This is used in the construction of the symmetric algebra from the tensor algebra.
- Dually, the category of anti-commutative associative algebras is a reflective subcategory of all associative algebras, where the reflector is quotienting out by the anti-commutator ideal. This is used in the construction of the exterior algebra from the tensor algebra.
- The category of fields is a reflective subcategory of the category of integral domains (with injective ring homomorphisms as morphisms). The reflector is the functor that sends each integral domain to its field of fractions.
- The category of abelian torsion groups is a coreflective subcategory of the category of abelian groups. The coreflector is the functor sending each group to its torsion subgroup.
- The categories of elementary abelian groups, abelian p-groups, and p-groups are all reflective subcategories of the category of groups, and the kernels of the reflection maps are important objects of study; see focal subgroup theorem.
- The category of groups is a coreflective subcategory of the category of monoids: the right adjoint maps a monoid to its group of units.

=== Topology ===
- The category of Kolmogorov spaces (T_{0} spaces) is a reflective subcategory of Top, the category of topological spaces, and the Kolmogorov quotient is the reflector.
- The category of completely regular spaces CReg is a reflective subcategory of Top. By taking Kolmogorov quotients, one sees that the subcategory of Tychonoff spaces is also reflective.
- The category of all compact Hausdorff spaces is a reflective subcategory of the category of all Tychonoff spaces (and of the category of all topological spaces). The reflector is given by the Stone–Čech compactification.
- The category of all complete metric spaces with uniformly continuous mappings is a reflective subcategory of the category of metric spaces. The reflector is the completion of a metric space on objects, and the extension by density on arrows.
- The category of sheaves is a reflective subcategory of presheaves on a topological space. The reflector is sheafification, which assigns to a presheaf the sheaf of sections of the bundle of its germs.
- The category Seq of sequential spaces is a coreflective subcategory of Top. The sequential coreflection of a topological space $(X,\tau)$ is the space $(X,\tau_{\mathrm{seq}})$, where the topology $\tau_{\text{seq}}$ is a finer topology than $\tau$ consisting of all sequentially open sets in $X$ (that is, complements of sequentially closed sets).

=== Functional analysis ===
- The category of Banach spaces is a reflective subcategory of the category of normed spaces and bounded linear operators. The reflector is the norm completion functor.

=== Category theory ===
- For any Grothendieck site (C, J), the topos of sheaves on (C, J) is a reflective subcategory of the topos of presheaves on C, with the special further property that the reflector functor is left exact. The reflector is the sheafification functor a : Presh(C) → Sh(C, J), and the adjoint pair (a, i) is an important example of a geometric morphism in topos theory.

== Properties ==
- The components of the counit are isomorphisms.
- If D is a reflective subcategory of C, then the inclusion functor D → C creates all limits that are present in C.
- A reflective subcategory has all colimits that are present in the ambient category.
- The monad induced by the reflector/localization adjunction is idempotent.

== Further terminology ==
If all reflection morphisms are (extremal) epimorphisms, then the full subcategory is said to be (extremal) epireflective. Similarly, it is bireflective if all reflection arrows are bimorphisms.

All these notions are special cases of the common generalization $E$-reflective subcategory, where $E$ is a class of morphisms.

The $E$-reflective hull of a class A of objects is defined as the smallest $E$-reflective subcategory containing A. Thus we can speak about the reflective hull, epireflective hull, extremal epireflective hull, etc.

An anti-reflective subcategory of $\mathcal{C}$ is a full subcategory $\mathcal{D}$ such that the only objects of $\mathcal{C}$ that have a reflection into $\mathcal{D}$ are those that are already in $\mathcal{D}$.

== See also ==
- Free functor
