= Bockstein spectral sequence =

In mathematics, the Bockstein spectral sequence is a spectral sequence relating the homology with mod p coefficients and the homology reduced mod p. It is named after Meyer Bockstein.

== Definition ==
Let C be a chain complex of torsion-free abelian groups and p a prime number. Then we have the exact sequence:

$$0 \longrightarrow C \overset{p}\longrightarrow C \overset{\text{mod} p} \longrightarrow C \otimes \Z/p \longrightarrow 0.$$

Taking integral homology H, we get the exact couple of "doubly graded" abelian groups:

$$H_*(C) \overset{i = p} \longrightarrow H_*(C) \overset{j} \longrightarrow H_*(C \otimes \Z/p) \overset{k} \longrightarrow.$$

where the grading goes: $H_*(C)_{s,t} = H_{s+t}(C)$ and the same for $H_*(C \otimes \Z/p),\deg i = (1, -1), \deg j = (0, 0), \deg k = (-1, 0).$

This gives the first page of the spectral sequence: we take $E_{s,t}^1 = H_{s+t}(C \otimes \Z/p)$ with the differential ${}^1 d = j \circ k$. The derived couple of the above exact couple then gives the second page and so forth. Explicitly, we have $D^r = p^{r-1} H_*(C)$ that fits into the exact couple:

$$D^r \overset{i=p}\longrightarrow D^r \overset{{}^r j} \longrightarrow E^r \overset{k}\longrightarrow$$

where ${}^r j = (\text{mod } p) \circ p^{-{r+1}}$ and $\deg ({}^r j) = (-(r-1), r - 1)$ (the degrees of i, k are the same as before). Now, taking $D_n^r \otimes -$ of

$$0 \longrightarrow \Z \overset{p}\longrightarrow \Z \longrightarrow \Z/p \longrightarrow 0,$$

we get:

$$0 \longrightarrow \operatorname{Tor}_1^{\Z}(D_n^r, \Z/p) \longrightarrow D_n^r \overset{p}\longrightarrow D_n^r \longrightarrow D_n^r \otimes \Z/p \longrightarrow 0$$.

This tells the kernel and cokernel of $D^r_n \overset{p}\longrightarrow D^r_n$. Expanding the exact couple into a long exact sequence, we get: for any r,

$$0 \longrightarrow (p^{r-1} H_n(C)) \otimes \Z/p \longrightarrow E^r_{n, 0} \longrightarrow \operatorname{Tor}(p^{r-1} H_{n-1}(C), \Z/p) \longrightarrow 0$$.

When $r = 1$, this is the same thing as the universal coefficient theorem for homology.

Assume the abelian group $H_*(C)$ is finitely generated; in particular, only finitely many cyclic modules of the form $\Z/p^s$ can appear as a direct summand of $H_*(C)$. Letting $r \to \infty$ we thus see $E^\infty$ is isomorphic to $(\text{free part of } H_*(C)) \otimes \Z/p$.
