= Rank of an abelian group =

Number of elements in a subset of a commutative group

In mathematics, the rank, Prüfer rank, or torsion-free rank of an abelian group A is the cardinality of a maximal linearly independent subset. The rank of A determines the size of the largest free abelian group contained in A. If A is torsion-free then it embeds into a vector space over the rational numbers of dimension rank A. For finitely generated abelian groups, rank is a strong invariant and every such group is determined up to isomorphism by its rank and torsion subgroup. Torsion-free abelian groups of rank 1 have been completely classified. However, the theory of abelian groups of higher rank is more involved.

The term rank has a different meaning in the context of elementary abelian groups.

== Definition ==
A subset {a_{α}} of an abelian group A is linearly independent (over Z) if the only linear combination of these elements that is equal to zero is trivial: if

$$\sum_\alpha n_\alpha a_\alpha = 0, \quad n_\alpha\in\mathbb{Z},$$

where all but finitely many coefficients n_{α} are zero (so that the sum is, in effect, finite), then all coefficients are zero. Any two maximal linearly independent sets in A have the same cardinality, which is called the rank of A.

The rank of an abelian group is analogous to the dimension of a vector space. The main difference with the case of vector space is a presence of torsion. An element of an abelian group A is a torsion element if its order is finite. The set of all torsion elements is a subgroup, called the torsion subgroup and denoted T(A). A group is called torsion-free if it has no non-trivial torsion elements. The factor-group A/T(A) is the unique maximal torsion-free quotient of A and its rank coincides with the rank of A.

The notion of rank with analogous properties can be defined for modules over any integral domain, the case of abelian groups corresponding to modules over Z. For this, see finitely generated module#Generic rank.

== Properties ==
- The rank of an abelian group A coincides with the dimension of the Q-vector space A ⊗ Q. If A is torsion-free then the canonical map A → A ⊗ Q is injective and the rank of A is the minimum dimension of Q-vector space containing A as an abelian subgroup. In particular, any intermediate group Z^{n} < A < Q^{n} has rank n.
- Abelian groups of rank 0 are exactly the periodic abelian groups.
- The group Q of rational numbers has rank 1. Torsion-free abelian groups of rank 1 are realized as subgroups of Q and there is a satisfactory classification of them up to isomorphism. By contrast, there is no satisfactory classification of torsion-free abelian groups of rank 2.
- Rank is additive over short exact sequences: if

$$0\to A\to B\to C\to 0\;$$

is a short exact sequence of abelian groups then rk B = rk A + rk C. This follows from the flatness of Q and the corresponding fact for vector spaces.

- Rank is additive over arbitrary direct sums:

$$\operatorname{rank}\left(\bigoplus_{j\in J}A_j\right) = \sum_{j\in J}\operatorname{rank}(A_j),$$

where the sum in the right hand side uses cardinal arithmetic.

== Groups of higher rank ==
Abelian groups of rank greater than 1 are sources of interesting examples. For instance, for every cardinal d there exist torsion-free abelian groups of rank d that are indecomposable, i.e. cannot be expressed as a direct sum of a pair of their proper subgroups. These examples demonstrate that torsion-free abelian group of rank greater than 1 cannot be simply built by direct sums from torsion-free abelian groups of rank 1, whose theory is well understood. Moreover, for every integer $n\ge 3$, there is a torsion-free abelian group of rank $2n-2$ that is simultaneously a sum of two indecomposable groups, and a sum of n indecomposable groups. Hence even the number of indecomposable summands of a group of an even rank greater or equal than 4 is not well-defined.

Another result about non-uniqueness of direct sum decompositions is due to A.L.S. Corner: given integers $n\ge k\ge 1$, there exists a torsion-free abelian group A of rank n such that for any partition $n = r_1 + \cdots + r_k$ into k natural summands, the group A is the direct sum of k indecomposable subgroups of ranks $r_1, r_2, \ldots, r_k$. Thus the sequence of ranks of indecomposable summands in a certain direct sum decomposition of a torsion-free abelian group of finite rank is very far from being an invariant of A.

Other surprising examples include torsion-free rank 2 groups A_{n,m} and B_{n,m} such that A^{n} is isomorphic to B^{n} if and only if n is divisible by m.

For abelian groups of infinite rank, there is an example of a group K and a subgroup G such that

- K is indecomposable;
- K is generated by G and a single other element; and
- Every nonzero direct summand of G is decomposable.

== Generalization ==
The notion of rank can be generalized for any module M over an integral domain R, as the dimension over R_{0}, the quotient field, of the tensor product of the module with the field:

$$\operatorname{rank} (M)=\dim_{R_0}( M\otimes_R R_0 )$$

It makes sense, since R_{0} is a field, and thus any module (or, to be more specific, vector space) over it is free.

It is a generalization, since every abelian group is a module over the integers. It easily follows that the dimension of the product over Q is the cardinality of maximal linearly independent subset, since for any torsion element x and any rational q,

$$x\otimes_{\mathbf Z} q = 0.$$

== See also ==
- Rank of a group
