= Finitely generated abelian group =

Commutative group where every element is the sum of elements from one finite subset

In abstract algebra, an abelian group $(G,+)$ is called finitely generated if there exist finitely many elements $x_1,\dots,x_s$ in $G$ such that every $x$ in $G$ can be written in the form $x = n_1x_1 + n_2x_2 + \cdots + n_sx_s$ for some integers $n_1,\dots, n_s$. In this case, we say that the set $\{x_1,\dots, x_s\}$ is a generating set of $G$ or that $x_1,\dots, x_s$ generate $G$. So, finitely generated abelian groups can be thought of as a generalization of cyclic groups.

Every finite abelian group is finitely generated. The finitely generated abelian groups can be completely classified.

== Examples ==
- The integers, $\left(\mathbb{Z},+\right)$, are a finitely generated abelian group.
- The integers modulo $n$, $\left(\mathbb{Z}/n\mathbb{Z},+\right)$, are a finite (hence finitely generated) abelian group.
- Any direct sum of finitely many finitely generated abelian groups is again a finitely generated abelian group.
- Every lattice forms a finitely generated free abelian group. Since every lattice is isomorphic with $\mathbb{R}^n$, this example is equivalent to a direct sum of integer sets.

There are no other examples (up to isomorphism). In particular, the group $\left(\mathbb{Q},+\right)$ of rational numbers is not finitely generated: if $x_1,\ldots,x_n$ are rational numbers, pick a natural number $k$ coprime to all the denominators; then $1/k$ cannot be generated by $x_1,\ldots,x_n$. The group $\left(\mathbb{Q}^*,\cdot\right)$ of non-zero rational numbers is also not finitely generated. The groups of real numbers under addition $\left(\mathbb{R},+\right)$ and non-zero real numbers under multiplication $\left(\mathbb{R}^*,\cdot\right)$ are also not finitely generated.

== Classification ==
The fundamental theorem of finitely generated abelian groups can be stated two ways, generalizing the two forms of the fundamental theorem of finite abelian groups. The theorem, in both forms, in turn generalizes to the structure theorem for finitely generated modules over a principal ideal domain, which in turn admits further generalizations.

=== Primary decomposition ===
The primary decomposition formulation states that every finitely generated abelian group G is isomorphic to a direct sum of primary cyclic groups and infinite cyclic groups. A primary cyclic group is one whose order is a power of a prime. That is, every finitely generated abelian group is isomorphic to a group of the form

$$\mathbb{Z}^n \oplus \mathbb{Z}/q_1\mathbb{Z} \oplus \cdots \oplus \mathbb{Z}/q_t\mathbb{Z},$$

where n ≥ 0 is the rank, and the numbers q_{1}, ..., q_{t} are powers of (not necessarily distinct) prime numbers. In particular, G is finite if and only if n = 0. The values of n, q_{1}, ..., q_{t} are (up to rearranging the indices) uniquely determined by G, that is, there is one and only one way to represent G as such a decomposition.

The proof of this statement uses the basis theorem for finite abelian group: every finite abelian group is a direct sum of primary cyclic groups. Denote the torsion subgroup of G as tG. Then, G/tG is a torsion-free abelian group and thus it is free abelian. tG is a direct summand of G, which means there exists a subgroup F of G s.t. $G=tG\oplus F$, where $F\cong G/tG$. Then, F is also free abelian. Since tG is finitely generated and each element of tG has finite order, tG is finite. By the basis theorem for finite abelian group, tG can be written as direct sum of primary cyclic groups.

=== Invariant factor decomposition ===
We can also write any finitely generated abelian group G as a direct sum of the form

$$\mathbb{Z}^n \oplus \mathbb{Z}/{k_1}\mathbb{Z} \oplus \cdots \oplus \mathbb{Z}/{k_u}\mathbb{Z},$$

where k_{1} divides k_{2}, which divides k_{3} and so on up to k_{u}. Again, the rank n and the invariant factors k_{1}, ..., k_{u} are uniquely determined by G (here with a unique order). The rank and the sequence of invariant factors determine the group up to isomorphism.

=== Equivalence ===
These statements are equivalent as a result of the Chinese remainder theorem, which implies that $\mathbb{Z}_{jk}\cong \mathbb{Z}_{j} \oplus \mathbb{Z}_{k}$ if and only if j and k are coprime.

=== History ===
The history and credit for the fundamental theorem is complicated by the fact that it was proven when group theory was not well-established, and thus early forms, while essentially the modern result and proof, are often stated for a specific case. Briefly, an early form of the finite case was proven by Gauss in 1801, the finite case was proven by Kronecker in 1870, and stated in group-theoretic terms by Frobenius and Stickelberger in 1878. The finitely presented case is solved by Smith normal form, and hence frequently credited to (Smith 1861), though the finitely generated case is sometimes instead credited to Poincaré in 1900; details follow.

Group theorist László Fuchs states:

As far as the fundamental theorem on finite abelian groups is concerned, it is not clear how far back in time one needs to go to trace its origin. ... it took a long time to formulate and prove the fundamental theorem in its present form ...

The fundamental theorem for finite abelian groups was proven by Leopold Kronecker in 1870, using a group-theoretic proof, though without stating it in group-theoretic terms; a modern presentation of Kronecker's proof is given in (Stillwell 2012), 5.2.2 Kronecker's Theorem, 176–177. This generalized an earlier result of Carl Friedrich Gauss from Disquisitiones Arithmeticae (1801), which classified quadratic forms; Kronecker cited this result of Gauss's. The theorem was stated and proved in the language of groups by Ferdinand Georg Frobenius and Ludwig Stickelberger in 1878. Another group-theoretic formulation was given by Kronecker's student Eugen Netto in 1882.

The fundamental theorem for finitely presented abelian groups was proven by Henry John Stephen Smith in (Smith 1861), as integer matrices correspond to finite presentations of abelian groups (this generalizes to finitely presented modules over a principal ideal domain), and Smith normal form corresponds to classifying finitely presented abelian groups.

The fundamental theorem for finitely generated abelian groups was proven by Henri Poincaré in 1900, using a matrix proof (which generalizes to principal ideal domains). This was done in the context of computing the homology of a complex, specifically the Betti number and torsion coefficients of a dimension of the complex, where the Betti number corresponds to the rank of the free part, and the torsion coefficients correspond to the torsion part.

Kronecker's proof was generalized to finitely generated abelian groups by Emmy Noether in 1926.

== Corollaries ==
Stated differently the fundamental theorem says that a finitely generated abelian group is the direct sum of a free abelian group of finite rank and a finite abelian group, each of those being unique up to isomorphism. The finite abelian group is just the torsion subgroup of G. The rank of G is defined as the rank of the torsion-free part of G; this is just the number n in the above formulas.

A corollary to the fundamental theorem is that every finitely generated torsion-free abelian group is free abelian. The finitely generated condition is essential here: $\mathbb{Q}$ is torsion-free but not free abelian.

Every subgroup and factor group of a finitely generated abelian group is again finitely generated abelian. The finitely generated abelian groups, together with the group homomorphisms, form an abelian category which is a Serre subcategory of the category of abelian groups.

== Non-finitely generated abelian groups ==
Note that not every abelian group of finite rank is finitely generated; the rank 1 group $\mathbb{Q}$ is one counterexample, and the rank-0 group given by a direct sum of countably infinitely many copies of $\mathbb{Z}_{2}$ is another one.

== See also ==
- The composition series in the Jordan–Hölder theorem is a non-abelian generalization.
