= Ludwig Stickelberger =

Swiss mathematician

- Ludwig Stickelberger
- Born: 18 May 1850; Buch, Schaffhausen, Switzerland
- Died: 11 April 1936 (aged 85); Basel, Basel-Stadt, Switzerland
- Education: University of Heidelberg; University of Berlin
- Known for: Stickelberger relation Frobenius–Stickelberger theorem
- Scientific career
- Fields: Mathematics
- Workplaces: University of Freiburg
- Thesis: De problemate quodam ad duarum bilinearium vel quadraticarum transformationem pertinente (1874)
- Doctoral advisor: Ernst Kummer, Karl Weierstrass

Ludwig Stickelberger (18 May 1850 – 11 April 1936) was a Swiss mathematician who made important contributions to linear algebra (theory of elementary divisors) and algebraic number theory (Stickelberger relation in the theory of cyclotomic fields).

== Biography ==
Stickelberger was born in Buch in the canton of Schaffhausen into a pastor’s family. He graduated from a gymnasium in 1867 and studied next in the University of Heidelberg. In 1874 he received a doctorate in Berlin under the direction of Karl Weierstrass for his work on the transformation of quadratic forms to a diagonal form. In the same year, he obtained his Habilitation from Polytechnicum in Zurich (now ETH Zurich). In 1879 he became an extraordinary professor in the Albert Ludwigs University of Freiburg. From 1896 to 1919 he worked there as a full professor, and from 1919 until his return to Basel in 1924, he held the title of a distinguished professor ("ordentlicher Honorarprofessor"). He was married in 1895, but his wife and son both died in 1918. Stickelberger died on 11 April 1936 and was buried next to his wife and son in Freiburg.

== Mathematical contributions ==
Stickelberger's obituary lists the total of 14 publications: his thesis (in Latin), 8 further papers that he authored which appeared during his lifetime, 4 joint papers with Georg Frobenius and a posthumously published paper written circa 1915. Despite this modest output, he is characterized there as "one of the sharpest among the pupils of Weierstrass" and a "mathematician of high rank". Stickelberger's thesis and several later papers streamline and complete earlier investigations of various authors, in a direct and elegant way.

=== Linear algebra ===
Stickelberger's work on the classification of pairs of bilinear and quadratic forms filled in important gaps in the theory earlier developed by Weierstrass and Darboux. Augmented with the contemporaneous work of Frobenius, it set the theory of elementary divisors upon a rigorous foundation. An important 1878 paper of Stickelberger and Frobenius gave the first complete treatment of the classification of finitely generated abelian groups and sketched the relation with the theory of modules that had just been developed by Dedekind.

=== Number theory ===
Three joint papers with Frobenius deal with the theory of elliptic functions. Today Stickelberger's name is most closely associated with his 1890 paper that established the Stickelberger relation for cyclotomic Gaussian sums. This generalized earlier work of Jacobi and Kummer and was later used by Hilbert in his formulation of the reciprocity laws in algebraic number fields. The Stickelberger relation also yields information about the structure of the class group of a cyclotomic field as a module over its abelian Galois group (cf Iwasawa theory).
