= Multiplicative group =

Mathematical structure with multiplication as its operation

In mathematics and group theory, the term multiplicative group refers to one of the following concepts:

- the group under multiplication of the invertible elements of a field, ring, or other structure for which one of its operations is referred to as multiplication. In the case of a field F, the group is (F ∖ {0}, •), where 0 refers to the zero element of F and the binary operation • is the field multiplication,
- the algebraic torus GL(1).

== Examples ==
- The multiplicative group of integers modulo n is the group under multiplication of the invertible elements of $\mathbf{Z}/n\mathbf{Z}$. When n is not prime, there are elements other than zero that are not invertible.
- The multiplicative group of positive real numbers $\mathbf{R}^+$ is an abelian group with 1 as its identity element. The logarithm is a group isomorphism of this group to the additive group of real numbers, $\mathbf{R}$.
- The multiplicative group of a field $F$ is the set of all nonzero elements: $F^\times = F \smallsetminus \{0\}$, under the multiplication operation. If $F$ is finite of order q (for example q = p a prime, and $F = \mathbb F_p=\mathbf{Z}/p\mathbf{Z}$), then the multiplicative group is cyclic: $F^\times \cong \mathrm{C}_{q-1}$.

== Group scheme of roots of unity ==
The group scheme of nth roots of unity is by definition the kernel of the n-power map on the multiplicative group GL(1), considered as a group scheme. That is, for any integer n > 1 we can consider the morphism on the multiplicative group that takes nth powers, and take an appropriate fiber product of schemes, with the morphism e that serves as the identity.

The resulting group scheme is written μ_{n} (or $\mu\!\!\mu_n$). It gives rise to a reduced scheme, when we take it over a field K, if and only if the characteristic of K does not divide n. This makes it a source of some key examples of non-reduced schemes (schemes with nilpotent elements in their structure sheaves); for example μ_{p} over a finite field with p elements for any prime number p.

This phenomenon is not easily expressed in the classical language of algebraic geometry. For example, it turns out to be of major importance in expressing the duality theory of abelian varieties in characteristic p (theory of Pierre Cartier). The Galois cohomology of this group scheme is a way of expressing Kummer theory.

== See also ==
- Multiplicative group of integers modulo n
- Additive group
