= Pure subgroup =

In mathematics, especially in the area of algebra studying the theory of abelian groups, a pure subgroup is a generalization of direct summand. It has found many uses in abelian group theory and related areas.

== Definition ==
A subgroup $S$ of a (typically abelian) group $G$ is said to be pure if whenever an element of $S$ has an $n^{\text{th}}$ root in $G$, it necessarily has an $n^{\text{th}}$ root in $S$. Formally: $\forall n \in\Z, a \in S$, the existence of an $x$ in G such that $x^n = a \Rightarrow$ the existence of a $y$ in S such that $y^n = a$.

== Origins ==
Pure subgroups are also called isolated subgroups or serving subgroups and were first investigated in Prüfer's 1923 paper, which described conditions for the decomposition of primary abelian groups as direct sums of cyclic groups using pure subgroups. The work of Prüfer was complemented by Kulikoff where many results were proved again using pure subgroups systematically. In particular, a proof was given that pure subgroups of finite exponent are direct summands. A more complete discussion of pure subgroups, their relation to infinite abelian group theory, and a survey of their literature is given in Irving Kaplansky's little red book.

== Properties ==
- Every direct summand of a group is a pure subgroup.
- Every pure subgroup of a pure subgroup is pure.
- A divisible subgroup of an abelian group is pure.
- If the quotient group is torsion-free, the subgroup is pure.
- The torsion subgroup of an abelian group is pure.
- The directed union of pure subgroups is a pure subgroup.

Since in a finitely generated abelian group the torsion subgroup is a direct summand, one might ask if the torsion subgroup is always a direct summand of an abelian group. It turns out that it is not always a summand, but it is a pure subgroup. Under certain mild conditions, pure subgroups are direct summands. So, one can still recover the desired result under those conditions, as in Kulikoff's paper. Pure subgroups can be used as an intermediate property between a result on direct summands with finiteness conditions and a full result on direct summands with less restrictive finiteness conditions. Another example of this use is Prüfer's paper, where the fact that "finite torsion abelian groups are direct sums of cyclic groups" is extended to the result that "all torsion abelian groups of finite exponent are direct sums of cyclic groups" via an intermediate consideration of pure subgroups.

== Generalizations ==
Pure subgroups were generalized in several ways in the theory of abelian groups and modules. Pure submodules were defined in a variety of ways, but eventually settled on the modern definition in terms of tensor products or systems of equations; earlier definitions were usually more direct generalizations such as the single equation used above for n'th roots. Pure injective and pure projective modules follow closely from the ideas of Prüfer's 1923 paper. While pure projective modules have not found as many applications as pure injectives, they are more closely related to the original work: A module is pure projective if it is a direct summand of a direct sum of finitely presented modules. In the case of the integers and abelian groups a pure projective module amounts to a direct sum of cyclic groups.

== See also ==
- Divisible group
