= Additive group =

Group with an addition as its operation

An additive group is a group of which the group operation is to be thought of as addition in some sense. It is usually abelian, and typically written using the symbol + for its binary operation.

This terminology is widely used with structures equipped with several operations to specify structures obtained by forgetting the other operations. Examples include the additive group of the integers, of a vector space and of a ring. This is particularly useful with rings and fields to distinguish the additive underlying group from the multiplicative group of the invertible elements.

In older terminology, an additive subgroup of a ring has also been known as a modul or module (not to be confused with a module).
