= Free abelian group =

Algebra of formal sums

In mathematics, a free abelian group is an abelian group with a basis. Being an abelian group means that it is a set with an addition operation that is associative, commutative, and invertible. A basis, also called an integral basis, is a subset such that every element of the group can be uniquely expressed as an integer combination of finitely many basis elements. For instance, the two-dimensional integer lattice forms a free abelian group, with coordinatewise addition as its operation, and with the two points (1, 0) and (0, 1) as its basis. Free abelian groups have properties which make them similar to vector spaces, and may equivalently be called free $\Z$-modules, the free modules over the integers. Lattice theory studies free abelian subgroups of real vector spaces. In algebraic topology, free abelian groups are used to define chain groups, and in algebraic geometry they are used to define divisors.

The elements of a free abelian group with basis $B$ may be described in several equivalent ways. These include formal sums over $B$, which are expressions of the form $\sum a_i b_i$ where each $a_i$ is a nonzero integer, each $b_i$ is a distinct basis element, and the sum has finitely many terms. Alternatively, the elements of a free abelian group may be thought of as signed multisets containing finitely many elements of $B$, with the multiplicity of an element in the multiset equal to its coefficient in the formal sum. Another way to represent an element of a free abelian group is as a function from $B$ to the integers with finitely many nonzero values; for this functional representation, the group operation is the pointwise addition of functions.

Every set $B$ has a free abelian group with $B$ as its basis. This group is unique in the sense that every two free abelian groups with the same basis are isomorphic. Instead of constructing it by describing its individual elements, a free abelian group with basis $B$ may be constructed as a direct sum of copies of the additive group of the integers, with one copy per member of $B$. Alternatively, the free abelian group with basis $B$ may be described by a presentation with the elements of $B$ as its generators and with the commutators of pairs of members as its relators. The rank of a free abelian group is the cardinality of a basis; every two bases for the same group give the same rank, and every two free abelian groups with the same rank are isomorphic. Every subgroup of a free abelian group is itself free abelian; this fact allows a general abelian group to be understood as a quotient of a free abelian group by "relations", or as a cokernel of an injective homomorphism between free abelian groups. The only free abelian groups that are free groups are the trivial group and the infinite cyclic group.

== Definition and examples ==
A lattice in the Euclidean plane. Adding any two blue lattice points produces another lattice point; the group formed by this addition operation is a free abelian group.

A free abelian group is an abelian group that has a basis. Here, being an abelian group means that it is described by a set $S$ of its elements and a binary operation on $S$, conventionally denoted as an additive group by the $+$ symbol (although it need not be the usual addition of numbers) that obey the following properties:

- The operation $+$ is commutative and associative, meaning for all elements $x$, $y$, and $z$ of $S$, $x+y=y+x$ and $(x+y)+z=x+(y+z)$. Therefore, when combining two or more elements of $S$ using this operation, the ordering and grouping of the elements does not affect the result.
- $S$ contains an identity element (conventionally denoted $0$) with the property that, for every element $x$, $x+0=0+x=x$.
- Every element $x$ in $S$ has an inverse element $-x$, such that $x+(-x)=0$.

A basis is a subset $B$ of the elements of $S$ with the property that every element of $S$ may be formed in a unique way by choosing finitely many basis elements $b_i$ of $B$, choosing a nonzero integer $k_i$ for each of the chosen basis elements, and adding together $k_i$ copies of the basis elements $b_i$ for which $k_i$ is positive, and $-k_i$ copies of $-b_i$ for each basis element for which $k_i$ is negative. As a special case, the identity element can always be formed in this way as the combination of zero basis elements, according to the usual convention for an empty sum, and it must not be possible to find any other combination that represents the identity.

The integers $\mathbb{Z}$, under the usual addition operation, form a free abelian group with the basis $\{1\}$. The integers are commutative and associative, with 0 as the additive identity with each integer having an additive inverse, its negation. Each non-negative $x$ is the sum of $x$ copies of $1$, and each negative integer $x$ is the sum of $-x$ copies of $-1$, so the basis property is also satisfied.

An example where the group operation is different from the usual addition of numbers is given by the positive rational numbers $\mathbb{Q}^+$, which form a free abelian group with the usual multiplication operation on numbers and with the prime numbers as their basis. Multiplication is commutative and associative, with the number $1$ as its identity and with $1/x$ as the inverse element for each positive rational number $x$. The prime numbers form a basis for multiplication of these numbers by the fundamental theorem of arithmetic, according to which every positive integer can be factorized uniquely into the product of finitely many primes or their inverses. If $q=a/b$ is a positive rational number expressed in simplest terms, then $q$ can be expressed as a finite combination of the primes appearing in the factorizations of $a$ and $b$. The number of copies of each prime to use in this combination is its exponent in the factorization of $a$, or the negation of its exponent in the factorization of $b$.

The polynomials of a single variable $x$, with integer coefficients, form a free abelian group under polynomial addition, with the powers of $x$ as a basis. As an abstract group, this is the same as (an isomorphic group to) the multiplicative group of positive rational numbers. One way to map these two groups to each other, showing that they are isomorphic, is to reinterpret the exponent of the $i$th prime number in the multiplicative group of the rationals as instead giving the coefficient of $x^{i-1}$ in the corresponding polynomial, or vice versa. For instance the rational number $5/27$ has exponents of $0, -3, 1$ for the first three prime numbers $2, 3, 5$ and would correspond in this way to the polynomial $-3x+x^2$ having the same coefficients $0, -3, 1$ for its constant, linear, and quadratic terms. Because these mappings merely reinterpret the same numbers, they define a bijection between the elements of the two groups. And because the group operation of multiplying positive rationals acts additively on the exponents of the prime numbers, in the same way that the group operation of adding polynomials acts on the coefficients of the polynomials, these maps preserve the group structure; they are homomorphisms. A bijective homomorphism is called an isomorphism, and its existence demonstrates that these two groups have the same properties.

Although the representation of each group element in terms of a given basis is unique, a free abelian group has generally more than one basis, and different bases will generally result in different representations of its elements. For example, if one replaces any element of a basis by its inverse, one gets another basis. As a more elaborated example, the two-dimensional integer lattice $\Z^2$, consisting of the points in the plane with integer Cartesian coordinates, forms a free abelian group under vector addition with the basis $\{(1,0),(0,1)\}$. For this basis, the element $(4,3)$ can be written $(4,3) = 4 \cdot (1,0) + 3 \cdot (0,1)$, where 'multiplication' is defined so that, for instance, $\ 4 \cdot (1,0) := (1,0) + (1,0) + (1,0) + (1,0)$. There is no other way to write $(4,3)$ in the same basis. However, with a different basis such as $\{(1,0),(1,1)\}$, it can be written as $(4,3) = (1,0) + 3\cdot (1,1)$. Generalizing this example, every lattice forms a finitely-generated free abelian group. The $d$-dimensional integer lattice $\Z^d$ has a natural basis consisting of the positive integer unit vectors, but it has many other bases as well: if $M$ is a $d\times d$ integer matrix with determinant $\pm 1$, then the rows of $M$ form a basis, and conversely every basis of the integer lattice has this form. For more on the two-dimensional case, see fundamental pair of periods.

== Constructions ==
Every set can be the basis of a free abelian group, which is unique up to group isomorphisms. The free abelian group for a given basis set can be constructed in several different but equivalent ways: as a direct sum of copies of the integers, as a family of integer-valued functions, as a signed multiset, or by a presentation of a group.

=== Products and sums ===
The direct product of groups consists of tuples of an element from each group in the product, with componentwise addition. The direct product of two free abelian groups is itself free abelian, with basis the disjoint union of the bases of the two groups. More generally the direct product of any finite number of free abelian groups is free abelian. The $d$-dimensional integer lattice, for instance, is isomorphic to the direct product of $d$ copies of the integer group $\Z$. The trivial group $\{0\}$ is also considered to be free abelian, with basis the empty set. It may be interpreted as an empty product, the direct product of zero copies of $\Z$.

For infinite families of free abelian groups, the direct product is not necessarily free abelian. For instance the Baer–Specker group $\mathbb{Z}^\mathbb{N}$, an uncountable group formed as the direct product of countably many copies of $\mathbb{Z}$, was shown in 1937 by Reinhold Baer to not be free abelian, although Ernst Specker proved in 1950 that all of its countable subgroups are free abelian. Instead, to obtain a free abelian group from an infinite family of groups, the direct sum rather than the direct product should be used. The direct sum and direct product are the same when they are applied to finitely many groups, but differ on infinite families of groups. In the direct sum, the elements are again tuples of elements from each group, but with the restriction that all but finitely many of these elements are the identity for their group. The direct sum of infinitely many free abelian groups remains free abelian. It has a basis consisting of tuples in which all but one element is the identity, with the remaining element part of a basis for its group.

Every free abelian group may be described as a direct sum of copies of $\mathbb{Z}$, with one copy for each member of its basis. This construction allows any set $B$ to become the basis of a free abelian group.

=== Integer functions and formal sums ===
Given a set $B$, one can define a group $\mathbb{Z}^{(B)}$ whose elements are functions from $B$ to the integers, where the parentheses in the superscript indicate that only the functions with finitely many nonzero values are included. If $f$ and $g$ are two such functions, then $f+g$ is the function whose values are sums of the values in $f$ and $g$: that is, $(f+g)(x)=f(x)+g(x)$. This pointwise addition operation gives $\mathbb{Z}^{(B)}$ the structure of an abelian group.

Each element $x$ from the given set $B$ corresponds to a member of $\mathbb{Z}^{(B)}$, the function $e_x$ for which $e_x(x)=1$ and for which $e_x(y)=0$ for all $y\ne x$. Every function $f$ in $\mathbb{Z}^{(B)}$ is uniquely a linear combination of a finite number of basis elements:
$$f=\sum_{\{x\mid f(x)\ne 0\}} f(x) e_x.$$
Thus, these elements $e_x$ form a basis for $\mathbb{Z}^{(B)}$, and $\mathbb{Z}^{(B)}$ is a free abelian group. In this way, every set $B$ can be made into the basis of a free abelian group.

The elements of $\mathbb{Z}^{(B)}$ may also be written as formal sums, expressions in the form of a sum of finitely many terms, where each term is written as the product of a nonzero integer with a distinct member of $B$. These expressions are considered equivalent when they have the same terms, regardless of the ordering of terms, and they may be added by forming the union of the terms, adding the integer coefficients to combine terms with the same basis element, and removing terms for which this combination produces a zero coefficient. They may also be interpreted as the signed multisets of finitely many elements of $B$.

=== Presentation ===
A presentation of a group is a set of elements that generate the group (meaning that all group elements can be expressed as products of finitely many generators), together with "relators", products of generators that give the identity element. The elements of a group defined in this way are equivalence classes of sequences of generators and their inverses, under an equivalence relation that allows inserting or removing any relator or generator-inverse pair as a contiguous subsequence. The free abelian group with basis $B$ has a presentation in which the generators are the elements of $B$, and the relators are the commutators of pairs of elements of $B$. Here, the commutator of two elements $x$ and $y$ is the product $x^{-1}y^{-1}xy$; setting this product to the identity causes $xy$ to equal $yx$, so that $x$ and $y$ commute. More generally, if all pairs of generators commute, then all pairs of products of generators also commute. Therefore, the group generated by this presentation is abelian, and the relators of the presentation form a minimal set of relators needed to ensure that it is abelian.

When the set of generators is finite, the presentation of a free abelian group is also finite, because there are only finitely many different commutators to include in the presentation. This fact, together with the fact that every subgroup of a free abelian group is free abelian (below) can be used to show that every finitely generated abelian group is finitely presented. For, if $G$ is finitely generated by a set $B$, it is a quotient of the free abelian group over $B$ by a free abelian subgroup, the subgroup generated by the relators of the presentation of $G$. But since this subgroup is itself free abelian, it is also finitely generated, and its basis (together with the commutators over $B$) forms a finite set of relators for a presentation of $G$.

== As a module ==
The modules over the integers are defined similarly to vector spaces over the real numbers or rational numbers: they consist of systems of elements that can be added to each other, with an operation for scalar multiplication by integers that is compatible with this addition operation. Every abelian group may be considered as a module over the integers, with a scalar multiplication operation defined as follows:

$0\,x=0$
$1\,x=x$
$n\,x=x+ (n-1)\,x,\quad$	if $n>1$
$n\,x=-((-n)\,x),$	if $n<0$

However, unlike vector spaces, not all abelian groups have a basis, hence the special name "free" for those that do. A free module is a module that can be represented as a direct sum over its base ring, so free abelian groups and free $\mathbb Z$-modules are equivalent concepts: each free abelian group is (with the multiplication operation above) a free $\mathbb Z$-module, and each free $\mathbb Z$-module comes from a free abelian group in this way. As well as the direct sum, another way to combine free abelian groups is to use the tensor product of $\Z$-modules. The tensor product of two free abelian groups is always free abelian, with a basis that is the Cartesian product of the bases for the two groups in the product.

Many important properties of free abelian groups may be generalized to free modules over a principal ideal domain. For instance, submodules of free modules over principal ideal domains are free, a fact that Hatcher (2002) writes allows for "automatic generalization" of homological machinery to these modules. Additionally, the theorem that every projective $\Z$-module is free generalizes in the same way.

== Properties ==
=== Universal property ===
A free abelian group $F$ with basis $B$ has the following universal property: for every function $f$ from $B$ to an abelian group $A$, there exists a unique group homomorphism from $F$ to $A$ which extends $f$. Here, a group homomorphism is a mapping from one group to the other that is consistent with the group product law: performing a product before or after the mapping produces the same result. By a general property of universal properties, this shows that "the" abelian group of base $B$ is unique up to an isomorphism. Therefore, the universal property can be used as a definition of the free abelian group of base $B$. The uniqueness of the group defined by this property shows that all the other definitions are equivalent.

It is because of this universal property that free abelian groups are called "free": they are the free objects in the category of abelian groups, the category that has abelian groups as its objects and homomorphisms as its arrows. The map from a basis to its free abelian group is a functor, a structure-preserving mapping of categories, from sets to abelian groups, and is adjoint to the forgetful functor from abelian groups to sets. However, a free abelian group is not a free group except in two cases: a free abelian group having an empty basis (rank zero, giving the trivial group) or having just one element in the basis (rank one, giving the infinite cyclic group). Other abelian groups are not free groups because in free groups $ab$ must be different from $ba$ if $a$ and $b$ are different elements of the basis, while in free abelian groups the two products must be identical for all pairs of elements. In the general category of groups, it is an added constraint to demand that $ab=ba$, whereas this is a necessary property in the category of abelian groups.

=== Rank ===
Every two bases of the same free abelian group have the same cardinality, so the cardinality of a basis forms an invariant of the group known as its rank. Two free abelian groups are isomorphic if and only if they have the same rank. A free abelian group is finitely generated if and only if its rank is a finite number $n$, in which case the group is isomorphic to $\mathbb{Z}^n$.

This notion of rank can be generalized, from free abelian groups to abelian groups that are not necessarily free. The rank of an abelian group $G$ is defined as the rank of a free abelian subgroup $F$ of $G$ for which the quotient group $G/F$ is a torsion group. Equivalently, it is the cardinality of a maximal subset of $G$ that generates a free subgroup. The rank is a group invariant: it does not depend on the choice of the subgroup.

=== Subgroups ===
Every subgroup of a free abelian group is itself a free abelian group. This result of Richard Dedekind was a precursor to the analogous Nielsen–Schreier theorem that every subgroup of a free group is free, and is a generalization of the fact that every nontrivial subgroup of the infinite cyclic group is infinite cyclic. The proof needs the axiom of choice. A proof using Zorn's lemma (one of many equivalent assumptions to the axiom of choice) can be found in Serge Lang's Algebra. Solomon Lefschetz and Irving Kaplansky argue that using the well-ordering principle in place of Zorn's lemma leads to a more intuitive proof.

In the case of finitely generated free abelian groups, the proof is easier, does not need the axiom of choice, and leads to a more precise result. If $G$ is a subgroup of a finitely generated free abelian group $F$, then $G$ is free and there exists a basis $(e_1, \ldots, e_n)$ of $F$ and positive integers $d_1|d_2|\ldots|d_k$ (that is, each one divides the next one) such that $(d_1e_1,\ldots, d_ke_k)$ is a basis of $G.$ Moreover, the sequence $d_1,d_2,\ldots,d_k$ depends only on $F$ and $G$ and not on the basis. A constructive proof of the existence part of the theorem is provided by any algorithm computing the Smith normal form of a matrix of integers. Uniqueness follows from the fact that, for any $r\le k$, the greatest common divisor of the minors of rank $r$ of the matrix is not changed during the Smith normal form computation and is the product $d_1\cdots d_r$ at the end of the computation.

=== Torsion and divisibility ===
All free abelian groups are torsion-free, meaning that there is no non-identity group element $x$ and nonzero integer $n$ such that $nx=0$. Conversely, all finitely generated torsion-free abelian groups are free abelian.

The additive group of rational numbers $\mathbb{Q}$ provides an example of a torsion-free (but not finitely generated) abelian group that is not free abelian. One reason that $\mathbb{Q}$ is not free abelian is that it is divisible, meaning that, for every element $x\in\mathbb{Q}$ and every nonzero integer $n$, it is possible to express $x$ as a scalar multiple $ny$ of another element $y=x/n$. In contrast, non-trivial free abelian groups are never divisible, because in a free abelian group the basis elements cannot be expressed as multiples of other elements.

=== Symmetry ===
The symmetries of any group can be described as group automorphisms, the invertible homomorphisms from the group to itself. In non-abelian groups these are further subdivided into inner and outer automorphisms, but in abelian groups all non-identity automorphisms are outer. They form another group, the automorphism group of the given group, under the operation of composition. The automorphism group of a free abelian group of finite rank $n$ is the general linear group $\operatorname{GL}(n,\mathbb{Z})$, which can be described concretely (for a specific basis of the free automorphism group) as the set of $n\times n$ invertible integer matrices under the operation of matrix multiplication. Their action as symmetries on the free abelian group $\Z^n$ is just matrix-vector multiplication.

The automorphism groups of two infinite-rank free abelian groups have the same first-order theories as each other, if and only if their ranks are equivalent cardinals from the point of view of second-order logic. This result depends on the structure of involutions of free abelian groups, the automorphisms that are their own inverse. Given a basis for a free abelian group, one can find involutions that map any set of disjoint pairs of basis elements to each other, or that negate any chosen subset of basis elements, leaving the other basis elements fixed. Conversely, for every involution of a free abelian group, one can find a basis of the group for which all basis elements are swapped in pairs, negated, or left unchanged by the involution.

=== Relation to other groups ===
If a free abelian group is a quotient of two groups $A/B$, then $A$ is the direct sum $B\oplus A/B$.

Given an arbitrary abelian group $A$, there always exists a free abelian group $F$ and a surjective group homomorphism from $F$ to $A$. One way of constructing a surjection onto a given group $A$ is to let $F=\mathbb{Z}^{(A)}$ be the free abelian group over $A$, represented as formal sums. Then a surjection can be defined by mapping formal sums in $F$ to the corresponding sums of members of $A$. That is, the surjection maps
$$\sum_{\{x\mid a_x\ne 0\}} a_x e_x \mapsto \sum_{\{x\mid a_x\ne 0\}} a_x x,$$
where $a_x$ is the integer coefficient of basis element $e_x$ in a given formal sum, the first sum is in $F$, and the second sum is in $A$. This surjection is the unique group homomorphism which extends the function $e_x\mapsto x$, and so its construction can be seen as an instance of the universal property.

When $F$ and $A$ are as above, the kernel $G$ of the surjection from $F$ to $A$ is also free abelian, as it is a subgroup of $F$ (the subgroup of elements mapped to the identity). Therefore, these groups form a short exact sequence
$$0\to G\to F\to A\to 0$$
in which $F$ and $G$ are both free abelian and $A$ is isomorphic to the factor group $F/G$. This is a free resolution of $A$. Furthermore, assuming the axiom of choice, the free abelian groups are precisely the projective objects in the category of abelian groups.

== Applications ==
=== Algebraic topology ===
In algebraic topology, a formal sum of $k$-dimensional simplices is called a $k$-chain, and the free abelian group having a collection of $k$-simplices as its basis is called a chain group. The simplices are generally taken from some topological space, for instance as the set of $k$-simplices in a simplicial complex, or the set of singular $k$-simplices in a manifold. Any $k$-dimensional simplex has a boundary that can be represented as a formal sum of $(k-1)$-dimensional simplices, and the universal property of free abelian groups allows this boundary operator to be extended to a group homomorphism from $k$-chains to $(k-1)$-chains. The system of chain groups linked by boundary operators in this way forms a chain complex, and the study of chain complexes forms the basis of homology theory.

=== Algebraic geometry and complex analysis ===
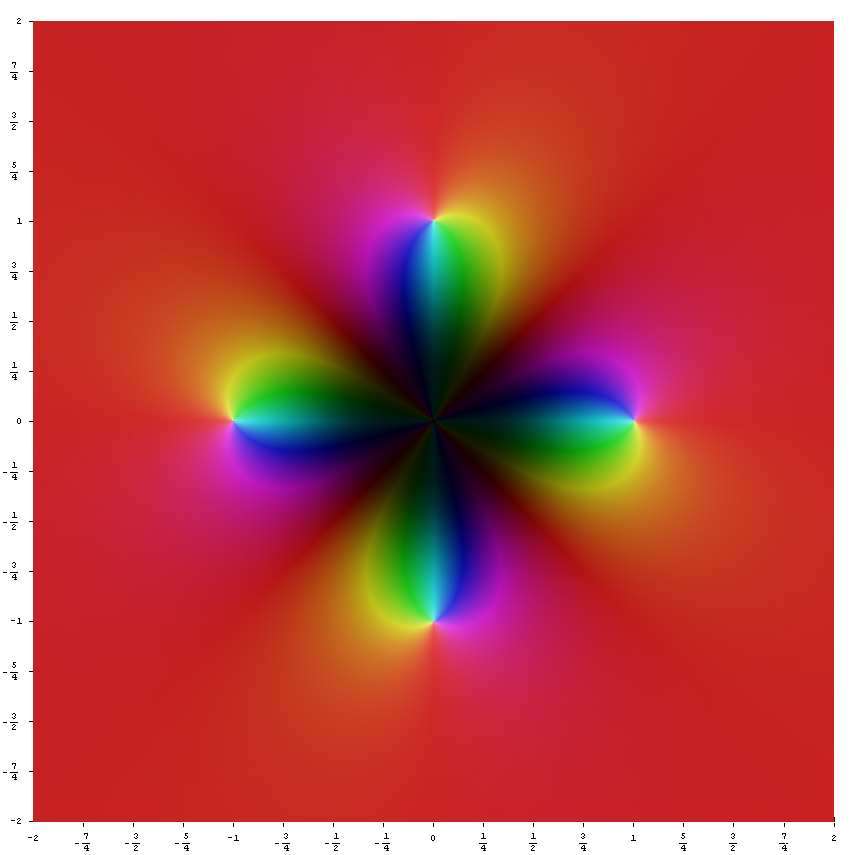
The rational function $z^4/(z^4-1)$ has a zero of order four at 0 (the black point at the center of the plot), and simple poles at the four complex numbers $\pm 1$ and $\pm i$ (the white points at the ends of the four petals). It can be represented (up to a scalar) by the divisor $4e_0-e_1-e_{-1}-e_i-e_{-i}$ where $e_z$ is the basis element for a complex number $z$ in a free abelian group over the complex numbers.

Every rational function over the complex numbers can be associated with a signed multiset of complex numbers $c_i$, the zeros and poles of the function (points where its value is zero or infinite). The multiplicity $m_i$ of a point in this multiset is its order as a zero of the function, or the negation of its order as a pole. Then the function itself can be recovered from this data, up to a scalar factor, as
$$f(q)=\prod (q-c_i)^{m_i}.$$
If these multisets are interpreted as members of a free abelian group over the complex numbers, then the product or quotient of two rational functions corresponds to the sum or difference of two group members. Thus, the multiplicative group of rational functions can be factored into the multiplicative group of complex numbers (the associated scalar factors for each function) and the free abelian group over the complex numbers. The rational functions that have a nonzero limiting value at infinity (the meromorphic functions on the Riemann sphere) form a subgroup of this group in which the sum of the multiplicities is zero.

This construction has been generalized, in algebraic geometry, to the notion of a divisor. There are different definitions of divisors, but in general they form an abstraction of a codimension-one subvariety of an algebraic variety, the set of solution points of a system of polynomial equations. In the case where the system of equations has one degree of freedom (its solutions form an algebraic curve or Riemann surface), a subvariety has codimension one when it consists of isolated points, and in this case a divisor is again a signed multiset of points from the variety. The meromorphic functions on a compact Riemann surface have finitely many zeros and poles, and their divisors form a subgroup of a free abelian group over the points of the surface, with multiplication or division of functions corresponding to addition or subtraction of group elements. To be a divisor, an element of the free abelian group must have multiplicities summing to zero, and meet certain additional constraints depending on the surface.

=== Group rings ===
The integral group ring $\Z[G]$, for any group $G$, is a ring whose additive group is the free abelian group over $G$. When $G$ is finite and abelian, the multiplicative group of units in $\Z[G]$ has the structure of a direct product of a finite group and a finitely generated free abelian group.
