= Prüfer group =

Mathematical term in group theory

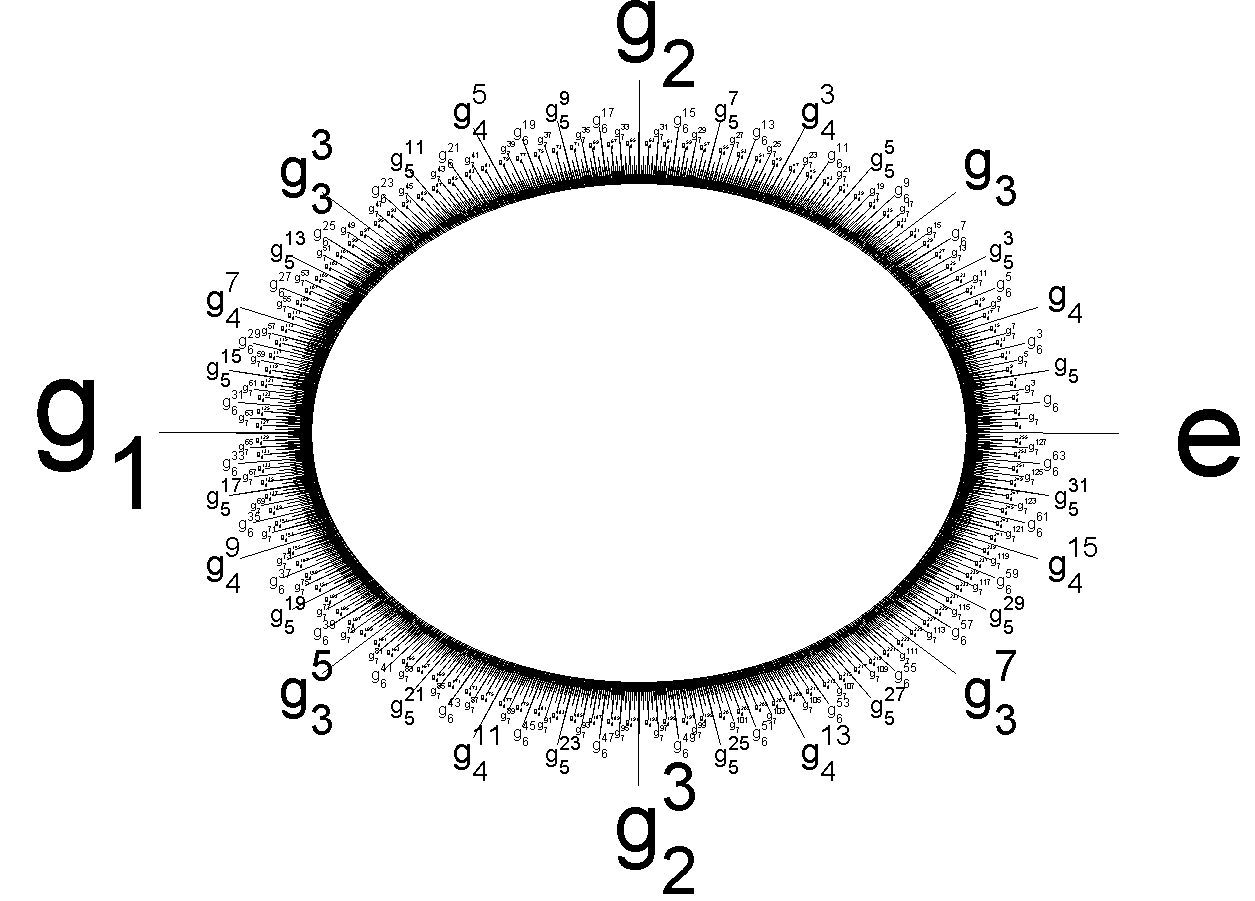
The Prüfer 2-group with presentation ⟨g_{n}: g_{n+1}^{2} = g_{n}, g_{1}^{2} = e⟩, illustrated as a subgroup of the unit circle in the complex plane

In mathematics, specifically in group theory, the Prüfer p-group or the p-quasicyclic group or $p^\infty$-group, $\mathbb Z(p^\infty)$, for a prime number p is the unique p-group in which every element has p different p-th roots.

The Prüfer p-groups are countable abelian groups that are important in the classification of infinite abelian groups: they (along with the group of rational numbers) form the smallest building blocks of all divisible groups.

The groups are named after Heinz Prüfer, a German mathematician of the early 20th century.

== Constructions ==
The Prüfer p-group may be identified with the subgroup of the circle group, $\operatorname{U}(1)$, consisting of all p^{n}-th roots of unity as n ranges over all non-negative integers:

$$\begin{align} \mathbb{Z}(p^\infty)&=\{e^{2\pi i m/p^n} \mid 0 \leq m < p^n,\,n\in \mathbb{Z}^+\} \\ &= \{z\in\mathbb{C} \mid z^{(p^n)}=1 \text{ for some } n\in \mathbb{Z}^+\}.\end{align}$$

The group operation here is the multiplication of complex numbers. There is a presentation

$$\mathbb{Z}(p^\infty) = \langle\, g_1, g_2, g_3, \ldots \mid g_1^p = 1, g_2^p = g_1, g_3^p = g_2, \dots\,\rangle.$$

Here, the group operation in $\mathbb{Z}(p^\infty)$ is written as multiplication.

Alternatively and equivalently, the Prüfer p-group may be defined as the Sylow p-subgroup of the quotient group $\mathbb{Q}/\mathbb{Z}$, consisting of those elements whose order is a power of p:

$$\mathbb{Z}(p^\infty) = \mathbb{Z}[1/p]/\mathbb{Z}$$

(where $\mathbb{Z}[1/p]$ denotes the group of all rational numbers whose denominator is a power of p, using addition of rational numbers as group operation).

For each natural number n, consider the quotient group $\mathbb{Z}/p^n \mathbb{Z}$ and the embedding $\mathbb{Z}/p^n \mathbb{Z}\to\mathbb{Z}/p^{n+1} \mathbb{Z}$ induced by multiplication by p. The direct limit of this system is $\mathbb{Z}(p^\infty)$:

$$\mathbb{Z}(p^\infty) = \varinjlim \mathbb{Z}/p^n \mathbb{Z} .$$

If we perform the direct limit in the category of topological groups, then we need to impose a topology on each of the $\mathbb{Z}/p^n \mathbb{Z}$, and take the final topology on $\mathbb{Z}(p^\infty)$. If we wish for $\mathbb{Z}(p^\infty)$ to be Hausdorff, we must impose the discrete topology on each of the $\mathbb{Z}/p^n \mathbb{Z}$, resulting in $\mathbb{Z}(p^\infty)$ to have the discrete topology.

We can also write

$$\mathbb{Z}(p^\infty)=\mathbb{Q}_p/\mathbb{Z}_p$$

where $\mathbb{Q}_p$ denotes the additive group of p-adic numbers and $\mathbb{Z}_p$ is the subgroup of p-adic integers.

== Properties ==
The complete list of subgroups of the Prüfer p-group $\mathbb{Z}(p^\infty)$ is:

$$0 \subsetneq \left({1 \over p}\mathbb{Z}\right)/\mathbb{Z} \subsetneq \left({1 \over p^2}\mathbb{Z}\right)/\mathbb{Z} \subsetneq \left({1 \over p^3}\mathbb{Z}\right)/\mathbb{Z} \subsetneq \cdots \subsetneq \mathbb{Z}(p^\infty)$$

Here, each $\left({1 \over p^n}\mathbb{Z}\right)/\mathbb{Z}$ is a cyclic subgroup of $\mathbb{Z}(p^\infty)$ with p^{n} elements; it contains precisely those elements of $\mathbb{Z}(p^\infty)$ whose order divides p^{n} and corresponds to the set of p^{n}-th roots of unity.

The Prüfer p-groups are the only infinite groups whose subgroups are totally ordered by inclusion. This sequence of inclusions expresses the Prüfer p-group as the direct limit of its finite subgroups. As there is no maximal subgroup of a Prüfer p-group, it is its own Frattini subgroup.

Given this list of subgroups, it is clear that the Prüfer p-groups are indecomposable (cannot be written as a direct sum of proper subgroups). More is true: the Prüfer p-groups are subdirectly irreducible. An abelian group is subdirectly irreducible if and only if it is isomorphic to a finite cyclic p-group or to a Prüfer group.

The Prüfer p-group is the unique infinite p-group that is locally cyclic (every finite set of elements generates a cyclic group). As seen above, all proper subgroups of $\mathbb{Z}(p^\infty)$ are finite. The Prüfer p-groups are the only infinite abelian groups with this property.

The Prüfer p-groups are divisible. They play an important role in the classification of divisible groups; along with the rational numbers they are the simplest divisible groups. More precisely: an abelian group is divisible if and only if it is the direct sum of a (possibly infinite) number of copies of $\mathbb{Q}$ and (possibly infinite) numbers of copies of $\mathbb{Z}(p^\infty)$ for every prime p. The (cardinal) numbers of copies of $\mathbb{Q}$ and $\mathbb{Z}(p^\infty)$ that are used in this direct sum determine the divisible group up to isomorphism.

As an abelian group (that is, as a Z-module), $\mathbb{Z}(p^\infty)$ is Artinian but not Noetherian. It can thus be used as a counterexample against the idea that every Artinian module is Noetherian (whereas every Artinian ring is Noetherian).

The endomorphism ring of $\mathbb{Z}(p^\infty)$ is isomorphic to the ring of p-adic integers $\mathbb{Z}_p$.

In the theory of locally compact topological groups the Prüfer p-group (endowed with the discrete topology) is the Pontryagin dual of the compact group of p-adic integers, and the group of p-adic integers is the Pontryagin dual of the Prüfer p-group.

== See also ==
- p-adic integers, which can be defined as the inverse limit of the finite subgroups of the Prüfer p-group.
- Dyadic rational, rational numbers of the form a/2^{b}. The Prüfer 2-group can be viewed as the dyadic rationals modulo 1.
- Cyclic group (finite analogue)
- Circle group (uncountably infinite analogue)
