= Torsion group =

Group in which each element has finite order

In group theory, a branch of mathematics, a torsion group or a periodic group is a group in which every element has finite order. The exponent of such a group, if it exists, is the least common multiple of the orders of the elements.

For example, it follows from Lagrange's theorem that every finite group is periodic and it has an exponent that divides its order.

== Infinite examples ==
Examples of infinite periodic groups include the additive group of the ring of polynomials over a finite field, and the quotient group of the rationals by the integers, as well as their direct summands, the Prüfer groups. Another example is the direct sum of all dihedral groups. None of these examples has a finite generating set. Explicit examples of finitely generated infinite periodic groups were constructed by Golod, based on joint work with Shafarevich (see Golod–Shafarevich theorem), and by Aleshin and Grigorchuk using automata. These groups have infinite exponent; examples with finite exponent are given for instance by Tarski monster groups constructed by Olshanskii.

== Burnside's problem ==
Burnside's problem is a classical question that deals with the relationship between periodic groups and finite groups, when only finitely generated groups are considered: Does specifying an exponent force finiteness? The existence of infinite, finitely generated periodic groups as in the previous paragraph shows that the answer is "no" for an arbitrary exponent. Though much more is known about which exponents can occur for infinite finitely generated groups there are still some for which the problem is open.

For some classes of groups, for instance linear groups, the answer to Burnside's problem restricted to the class is positive.

== Mathematical logic ==
An interesting property of periodic groups is that the definition cannot be formalized in terms of first-order logic. This is because doing so would require an axiom of the form

$$\forall x,\big((x =  e) \lor (x\circ x=e) \lor ((x\circ x)\circ x=e) \lor \cdots\big) ,$$

which contains an infinite disjunction and is therefore inadmissible: first order logic permits quantifiers over the sort(s) of individuals and cannot capture properties or "subsets" of that sort. It is also not possible to get around this infinite disjunction by using an infinite set of axioms: the compactness theorem implies that no set of first-order formulae can characterize the periodic groups.

== Related notions ==
The torsion subgroup of an abelian group A is the subgroup of A that consists of all elements that have finite order. A torsion abelian group is an abelian group in which every element has finite order. A torsion-free abelian group is an abelian group in which the identity element is the only element with finite order.

== See also ==
- Torsion (algebra)
- Jordan–Schur theorem
