= Torsion-free abelian group =

Abelian group with no non-trivial torsion elements

In mathematics, specifically in abstract algebra, a torsion-free abelian group is an abelian group which has no non-trivial torsion elements; that is, a group in which the group operation is commutative and the identity element is the only element with finite order.

While finitely generated abelian groups are completely classified, not much is known about infinitely generated abelian groups, even in the torsion-free countable case.

== Definitions ==
An abelian group $\langle G, + ,0\rangle$ is said to be torsion-free if no element other than the identity $e$ is of finite order. Explicitly, for any $n > 0$, the only element $x \in G$ for which $nx = 0$ is $x = 0$.

A natural example of a torsion-free group is $\langle \mathbb Z,+,0\rangle$, as only the integer 0 can be added to itself finitely many times to reach 0. More generally, the free abelian group $\mathbb Z^r$ is torsion-free for any $r \in \mathbb N$. An important step in the proof of the classification of finitely generated abelian groups is that every such torsion-free group is isomorphic to a $\mathbb Z^r$.

A non-finitely generated countable example is given by the additive group of the polynomial ring $\mathbb Z[X]$ (the free abelian group of countable rank).

More complicated examples are the additive group of the rational field $\mathbb Q$, or its subgroups such as $\mathbb Z[p^{-1}]$ (rational numbers whose denominator is a power of $p$). Yet more involved examples are given by groups of higher rank.

== Groups of rank 1 ==
=== Rank ===
The rank of an abelian group $A$ is the dimension of the $\mathbb Q$-vector space $\mathbb Q \otimes_{\mathbb Z} A$. Equivalently it is the maximal cardinality of a linearly independent (over $\Z$) subset of $A$.

If $A$ is torsion-free then it injects into $\mathbb Q \otimes_{\mathbb Z} A$. Thus, torsion-free abelian groups of rank 1 are exactly subgroups of the additive group $\mathbb Q$.

=== Classification ===
Torsion-free abelian groups of rank 1 have been completely classified. To do so one associates to a group $A$ a function $\tau_A$ from prime numbers to extended non-negative integers $\mathbb{N} \cup \{\infty\}$, as follows: pick any $x \in A \setminus \{0\}$, for a prime $p$ let $\tau_A(p)$ be the largest $k \in \mathbb{N}$ for which $x \in p^kA$ (and $\tau_A(p) = \infty$ if this holds for all $k \in \mathbb N$). For example, if $A$ is generated by the reciprocals of all primes $\{1/2, 1/3, 1/5, \dots\}$, $\tau_A(p) = 1$ for all primes $p$. For $A = \mathbb{Z}[1/2]$$\tau_A(2) = \infty, \tau_A(p) = 0$ for all $p \geq 3$

The definition does not depend on the choice of $x$ since for another $y \in A\setminus \{0\}$ there exists $n, m \in \mathbb Z\setminus\{0\}$ such that $ny = mx$.

The functions $\tau_A, \tau_B$ of two groups $A, B$ that are isomorphic will be equal, except at finitely many primes at which they both take finite values. Baer proved that the converse is true: If two rank-1 torsion-free abelian groups have the same function $\tau_A$ up to finitely many finite values, they are isomorphic. Therefore, $\tau(A)$ modulo the equivalence relation 'equal at all but finitely many finite values' is a complete isomorphism invariant for rank-1 torsion free abelian groups.

== Classification problem in general ==
The hardness of a classification problem for a certain type of structures on a countable set can be quantified using model theory and descriptive set theory. In this sense it has been proved that the classification problem for countable torsion-free abelian groups is as hard as possible. It is also known that even for torsion-free abelian groups of rank 2, the problem is very hard in a precise sense, though it is 'easier' than for rank 3.
