= Cyclic group =

Mathematical group that can be generated as the set of powers of a single element

In abstract algebra, a cyclic group or monogenous group is a group that is generated by a single element. That is, it is a set of invertible elements with a single associative binary operation, and it contains an element g such that every other element of the group may be obtained by repeatedly applying the group operation to g or its inverse. Each element can be written as an integer power of g in multiplicative notation, or as an integer multiple of g in additive notation. This element g is called a generator of the group.

Every infinite cyclic group is isomorphic to the additive group of Z, the integers. Every finite cyclic group of order n is isomorphic to the additive group of Z/nZ, the integers modulo n. A finite cyclic group of order n is often denoted by C_{n}, $\Z$_{n} or Z_{n} (not to be confused with the commutative ring of p-adic numbers). Every cyclic group is an abelian group (meaning that its group operation is commutative), and every finitely generated abelian group is a direct product of cyclic groups.

Every cyclic group of prime order is a simple group, which cannot be broken down into smaller groups. In the classification of finite simple groups, one of the three infinite classes consists of the cyclic groups of prime order. The cyclic groups of prime order are thus among the building blocks from which all groups can be built.

== Definition and notation ==
The six 6th complex roots of unity form a cyclic group under multiplication. Here, z is a generator, but z^{2} is not, because its powers fail to produce the odd powers of z.

For any element g in any group G, one can form the subgroup that consists of all its integer powers: ⟨g⟩ = { g^{k} | k ∈ Z }, called the cyclic subgroup generated by g. The order of g is |⟨g⟩|, the number of elements in ⟨g⟩, conventionally abbreviated as |g|, as ord(g), or as o(g). That is, the order of an element is equal to the order of the cyclic subgroup that it generates.

A cyclic group is a group which is equal to one of its cyclic subgroups: G = ⟨g⟩ for some element g, called a generator of G.

For a finite cyclic group G of order n we have G = {e, g, g^{2}, ... , g^{n−1}}, where e is the identity element and g^{i} = g^{j} whenever i ≡ j (mod n); in particular g^{n} = g^{0} = e, and g^{−1} = g^{n−1}. An abstract group defined by this multiplication is often denoted C_{n}, and we say that G is isomorphic to the standard cyclic group C_{n}. Such a group is also isomorphic to Z/nZ, the group of integers modulo n with the addition operation, which is the standard cyclic group in additive notation. Under the isomorphism χ defined by χ(g^{i}) = i the identity element e corresponds to 0, products correspond to sums, and powers correspond to multiples.

For example, the set of complex 6th roots of unity:
$$G = \left\{\pm 1, \pm{ \left(\tfrac 1 2 + \tfrac{\sqrt 3}{2}i\right)}, \pm{\left(\tfrac 1 2 - \tfrac{\sqrt 3}{2}i\right)}\right\}$$
forms a group under multiplication. It is cyclic, since it is generated by the primitive root $z = \tfrac 1 2 + \tfrac{\sqrt 3}{2}i=e^{2\pi i/6}:$ that is, G = ⟨z⟩ = { 1, z, z^{2}, z^{3}, z^{4}, z^{5} } with z^{6} = 1. Under a change of letters, this is isomorphic to (structurally the same as) the standard cyclic group of order 6, defined as C_{6} = ⟨g⟩ = { e, g, g^{2}, g^{3}, g^{4}, g^{5} } with multiplication g^{j} · g^{k} = g^{j+k} ^{(mod 6)}, so that g^{6} = g^{0} = e. These groups are also isomorphic to Z/6Z = {0, 1, 2, 3, 4, 5} with the operation of addition modulo 6, with z^{k} and g^{k} corresponding to k. For example, 1 + 2 ≡ 3 (mod 6) corresponds to z^{1} · z^{2} = z^{3}, and 2 + 5 ≡ 1 (mod 6) corresponds to z^{2} · z^{5} = z^{7} = z^{1}, and so on. Any element generates its own cyclic subgroup, such as ⟨z^{2}⟩ = { e, z^{2}, z^{4} } of order 3, isomorphic to C_{3} and Z/3Z; and ⟨z^{5}⟩ = { e, z^{5}, z^{10} = z^{4}, z^{15} = z^{3}, z^{20} = z^{2}, z^{25} = z } = G, so that z^{5} has order 6 and is an alternative generator of G.

Instead of the quotient notations Z/nZ, Z/(n), or Z/n, some authors denote a finite cyclic group as Z_{n}, but this clashes with the notation of number theory, where Z_{p} denotes a p-adic number ring, or localization at a prime ideal.

Infinite cyclic groups
p1, (*∞∞)	p11g, (22∞)
Two frieze groups are isomorphic to Z. With one generator, p1 has translations and p11g has glide reflections.

On the other hand, in an infinite cyclic group G = ⟨g⟩, the powers g^{k} give distinct elements for all integers k, so that G = { ... , g^{−2}, g^{−1}, e, g, g^{2}, ... }, and G is isomorphic to the standard group C = C_{∞} and to Z, the additive group of the integers. An example is the first frieze group. Here there are no finite cycles, and the name "cyclic" may be misleading.

To avoid this confusion, Bourbaki introduced the term monogenous group for a group with a single generator and restricted "cyclic group" to mean a finite monogenous group, avoiding the term "infinite cyclic group". (Note: DEFINITION 15. A group is called monogenous if it admits a system of generators consisting of a single element. A finite monogenous group is called cyclic.)

== Examples ==
Examples of cyclic groups in rotational symmetry
Scalene triangle
$\mathrm{C}_1$

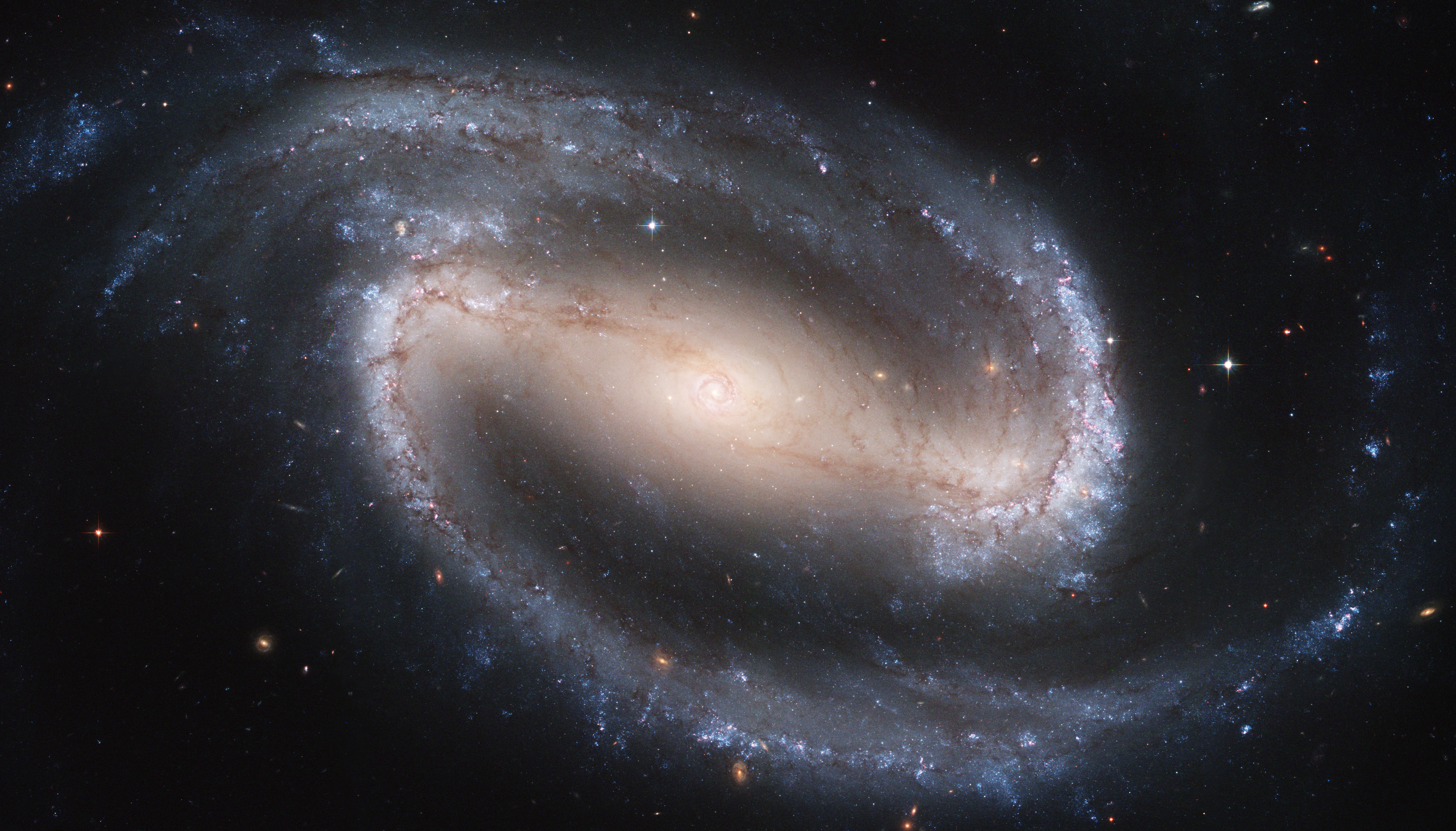
NGC 1300
$\mathrm{C}_2$

Flag of the Isle of Man
$\mathrm{C}_3$

Celtic knot
$\mathrm{C}_4$

Flag of Hong Kong
$\mathrm{C}_5$

Olavsrose
$\mathrm{C}_6$

=== Integer and modular addition ===
The set of integers Z, with the operation of addition, forms a group. It is an infinite cyclic group, because all integers can be written by repeatedly adding or subtracting the single number 1. In this group, 1 and −1 are the only generators. Every infinite cyclic group is isomorphic to Z.

For every positive integer n, the set of integers modulo n, again with the operation of addition, forms a finite cyclic group, denoted Z/nZ. A modular integer i is a generator of this group if i is relatively prime to n, because these elements can generate all other elements of the group through integer addition. (The number of such generators is φ(n), where φ is the Euler totient function.) Every finite cyclic group G is isomorphic to Z/nZ, where n = |G| is the order of the group.

The addition operations on integers and modular integers, used to define the cyclic groups, are the addition operations of commutative rings, also denoted Z and Z/nZ or Z/(n). If p is a prime, then Z/pZ is a finite field, and is usually denoted F_{p} or GF(p) for Galois field.

=== Modular multiplication ===
For every positive integer n, the set of the integers modulo n that are relatively prime to n is written as (Z/nZ)^{×}; it forms a group under the operation of multiplication. This group is not always cyclic, but is so whenever n is 1, 2, 4, a power of an odd prime, or twice a power of an odd prime (sequence A033948 in the OEIS). This is the multiplicative group of units of the ring Z/nZ; there are φ(n) of them, where again φ is the Euler totient function. For example, (Z/6Z)^{×} = {1, 5}, and since 6 is twice an odd prime this is a cyclic group. In contrast, (Z/8Z)^{×} = {1, 3, 5, 7} is a Klein 4-group and is not cyclic. When (Z/nZ)^{×} is cyclic, its generators are called primitive roots modulo n.

For a prime number p, the group (Z/pZ)^{×} is always cyclic, consisting of the non-zero elements of the finite field of order p. More generally, every finite subgroup of the multiplicative group of any field is cyclic.

=== Rotational symmetries ===
The set of rotational symmetries of a polygon forms a finite cyclic group. If there are n different ways of moving the polygon to itself by a rotation (including the null rotation) then this symmetry group is isomorphic to Z/nZ. In three or higher dimensions there exist other finite symmetry groups that are cyclic, but which are not all rotations around an axis, but instead rotoreflections.

The group of all rotations of a circle (the circle group, also denoted S^{1}) is not cyclic, because there is no single rotation whose integer powers generate all rotations. In fact, the infinite cyclic group C_{∞} is countable, while S^{1} is not. The group of rotations by rational angles is countable, but still not cyclic.

=== Galois theory ===
An nth root of unity is a complex number whose nth power is 1, a root of the polynomial x^{n} − 1. The set of all nth roots of unity forms a cyclic group of order n under multiplication. The generators of this cyclic group are the nth primitive roots of unity; they are the roots of the nth cyclotomic polynomial. For example, the polynomial z^{3} − 1 factors as (z − 1)(z − ω)(z − ω^{2}), where ω = e^{2πi/3}; the set {1, ω, ω^{2}} = {ω^{0}, ω^{1}, ω^{2}} forms a cyclic group under multiplication. The Galois group of the field extension of the rational numbers generated by the nth roots of unity forms a different group, isomorphic to the multiplicative group (Z/nZ)^{×} of order φ(n), which is cyclic for some but not all n (see above).

A field extension is called a cyclic extension if its Galois group is cyclic. For fields of characteristic zero, such extensions are the subject of Kummer theory, and are intimately related to solvability by radicals. For an extension of finite fields of characteristic p, its Galois group is always finite and cyclic, generated by a power of the Frobenius mapping. Conversely, given a finite field F and a finite cyclic group G, there is a finite field extension of F whose Galois group is G.

== Subgroups ==
All subgroups and quotient groups of cyclic groups are cyclic. Specifically, all subgroups of Z are of the form ⟨m⟩ = mZ, with m a positive integer. All of these subgroups are distinct from each other, and apart from the trivial group {0} = 0Z, they all are isomorphic to Z. The lattice of subgroups of Z is isomorphic to the dual of the lattice of natural numbers ordered by divisibility. Thus, since a prime number p has no nontrivial divisors, pZ is a maximal proper subgroup, and the quotient group Z/pZ is simple; in fact, a cyclic group is simple if and only if its order is prime.

All quotient groups Z/nZ are finite, with the exception Z/0Z = Z/{0}. For every positive divisor d of n, the quotient group Z/nZ has precisely one subgroup of order d, generated by the residue class of n/d. There are no other subgroups.

== Additional properties ==
Every cyclic group is abelian. That is, its group operation is commutative: gh = hg (for all g and h in G). This is clear for the groups of integer and modular addition since r + s ≡ s + r (mod n), and it follows for all cyclic groups since they are all isomorphic to these standard groups. For a finite cyclic group of order n, g^{n} is the identity element for any element g. This again follows by using the isomorphism to modular addition, since kn ≡ 0 (mod n) for every integer k. (This is also true for a general group of order n, due to Lagrange's theorem.)

For a prime power $p^k$, the group $Z/p^k Z$ is called a primary cyclic group. The fundamental theorem of abelian groups states that every finitely generated abelian group is a finite direct product of primary cyclic and infinite cyclic groups.

Because a cyclic group is abelian, each of its conjugacy classes consists of a single element. A cyclic group of order n therefore has n conjugacy classes.

If d is a divisor of n, then the number of elements in Z/nZ which have order d is φ(d), and the number of elements whose order divides d is exactly d. If G is a finite group in which, for each n > 0, G contains at most n elements of order dividing n, then G must be cyclic. (Note: This implication remains true even if only prime values of n are considered. (And observe that when n is prime, there is exactly one element whose order is a proper divisor of n, namely the identity.)) The order of an element m in Z/nZ is n/gcd(n,m).

If n and m are coprime, then the direct product of two cyclic groups Z/nZ and Z/mZ is isomorphic to the cyclic group Z/nmZ, and the converse also holds: this is one form of the Chinese remainder theorem. For example, Z/12Z is isomorphic to the direct product Z/3Z × Z/4Z under the isomorphism (k mod 12) → (k mod 3, k mod 4); but it is not isomorphic to Z/6Z × Z/2Z, in which every element has order at most 6.

If p is a prime number, then any group with p elements is isomorphic to the simple group Z/pZ. A number n is called a cyclic number if Z/nZ is the only group of order n, which is true exactly when gcd(n, φ(n)) = 1. The sequence of cyclic numbers include all primes, but some are composite such as 15. However, all cyclic numbers are odd except 2. The cyclic numbers are:

1, 2, 3, 5, 7, 11, 13, 15, 17, 19, 23, 29, 31, 33, 35, 37, 41, 43, 47, 51, 53, 59, 61, 65, 67, 69, 71, 73, 77, 79, 83, 85, 87, 89, 91, 95, 97, 101, 103, 107, 109, 113, 115, 119, 123, 127, 131, 133, 137, 139, 141, 143, ... (sequence A003277 in the OEIS)

The definition immediately implies that cyclic groups have group presentation C_{∞} = ⟨x | ⟩ and C_{n} = ⟨x | x^{n}⟩ for finite n.

== Associated objects ==
=== Representations ===
The representation theory of the cyclic group is a critical base case for the representation theory of more general finite groups. In the complex case, a representation of a cyclic group decomposes into a direct sum of linear characters, making the connection between character theory and representation theory transparent. In the positive characteristic case, the indecomposable representations of the cyclic group form a model and inductive basis for the representation theory of groups with cyclic Sylow subgroups and more generally the representation theory of blocks of cyclic defect.

=== Cycle graph ===
A cycle graph illustrates the various cycles of a group and is particularly useful in visualizing the structure of small finite groups. A cycle graph for a cyclic group is simply a circular graph, where the group order is equal to the number of nodes. A single generator defines the group as a directional path on the graph, and the inverse generator defines a backwards path. A trivial path (identity) can be drawn as a loop but is usually suppressed. Z_{2} is sometimes drawn with two curved edges as a multigraph.

A cyclic group Z_{n}, with order n, corresponds to a single cycle graphed simply as an n-sided polygon with the elements at the vertices.

Cycle graphs up to order 24
Z_{1}	Z_{2}	Z_{3}	Z_{4}	Z_{5}	Z_{6} = Z_{3}×Z_{2}	Z_{7}	Z_{8}
Z_{9}	Z_{10} = Z_{5}×Z_{2}	Z_{11}	Z_{12} = Z_{4}×Z_{3}	Z_{13}	Z_{14} = Z_{7}×Z_{2}	Z_{15} = Z_{5}×Z_{3}	Z_{16}
Z_{17}	Z_{18} = Z_{9}×Z_{2}	Z_{19}	Z_{20} = Z_{5}×Z_{4}	Z_{21} = Z_{7}×Z_{3}	Z_{22} = Z_{11}×Z_{2}	Z_{23}	Z_{24} = Z_{8}×Z_{3}

=== Cayley graph ===
The Paley graph of order 13, a circulant graph formed as the Cayley graph of Z/13 with generator set {1,3,4}

A Cayley graph is a graph defined from a pair (G,S) where G is a group and S is a set of generators for the group; it has a vertex for each group element, and an edge for each product of an element with a generator. In the case of a finite cyclic group, with its single generator, the Cayley graph is a cycle graph, and for an infinite cyclic group with its generator the Cayley graph is a doubly infinite path graph. However, Cayley graphs can be defined from other sets of generators as well. The Cayley graphs of cyclic groups with arbitrary generator sets are called circulant graphs. These graphs may be represented geometrically as a set of equally spaced points on a circle or on a line, with each point connected to neighbors with the same set of distances as each other point. They are exactly the vertex-transitive graphs whose symmetry group includes a transitive cyclic group.

=== Endomorphisms ===
The endomorphism ring of the abelian group Z/nZ is isomorphic to Z/nZ itself as a ring. Under this isomorphism, the number r corresponds to the endomorphism of Z/nZ that maps each element to the sum of r copies of it. This is a bijection if and only if r is coprime with n, so the automorphism group of Z/nZ is isomorphic to the unit group (Z/nZ)^{×}.

Similarly, the endomorphism ring of the additive group of Z is isomorphic to the ring Z. Its automorphism group is isomorphic to the group of units of the ring Z, which is ({−1, +1}, ×) ≅ C_{2}.

=== Tensor product and Hom of cyclic groups ===
The tensor product Z/mZ ⊗ Z/nZ can be shown to be isomorphic to Z / gcd(m, n)Z. So we can form the collection of group homomorphisms from Z/mZ to Z/nZ, denoted hom(Z/mZ, Z/nZ), which is itself a group.

For the tensor product, this is a consequence of the general fact that R/I ⊗_{R} R/J ≅ R/(I + J), where R is a commutative ring with unit and I and J are ideals of the ring. For the Hom group, recall that it is isomorphic to the subgroup of Z / nZ consisting of the elements of order dividing m. That subgroup is cyclic of order gcd(m, n), which completes the proof.

== Related classes of groups ==
Several other classes of groups have been defined by their relation to the cyclic groups:

=== Virtually cyclic groups ===
A group is called virtually cyclic if it contains a cyclic subgroup of finite index (the number of cosets that the subgroup has). In other words, any element in a virtually cyclic group can be arrived at by multiplying a member of the cyclic subgroup and a member of a certain finite set. Every cyclic group is virtually cyclic, as is every finite group. An infinite group is virtually cyclic if and only if it is finitely generated and has exactly two ends; (Note: If G has two ends, the explicit structure of G is well known: G is an extension of a finite group by either the infinite cyclic group or the infinite dihedral group.) an example of such a group is the direct product of Z/nZ and Z, in which the factor Z has finite index n. Every abelian subgroup of a Gromov hyperbolic group is virtually cyclic.

=== Procyclic groups ===
A profinite group is called procyclic if it can be topologically generated by a single element. Examples of profinite groups include the profinite integers $\widehat{\Z}$ or the p-adic integers $\Z_p$ for a prime number p.

=== Locally cyclic groups ===
A locally cyclic group is a group in which each finitely generated subgroup is cyclic. An example is the additive group of the rational numbers: every finite set of rational numbers is a set of integer multiples of a single unit fraction, the inverse of their lowest common denominator, and generates as a subgroup a cyclic group of integer multiples of this unit fraction. A group is locally cyclic if and only if its lattice of subgroups is a distributive lattice.

=== Cyclically ordered groups ===
A cyclically ordered group is a group together with a cyclic order preserved by the group structure. Every cyclic group can be given a structure as a cyclically ordered group, consistent with the ordering of the integers (or the integers modulo the order of the group). Every finite subgroup of a cyclically ordered group is cyclic.

=== Metacyclic and polycyclic groups ===
A metacyclic group is a group containing a cyclic normal subgroup whose quotient is also cyclic. These groups include the cyclic groups, the dicyclic groups, and the direct products of two cyclic groups. The polycyclic groups generalize metacyclic groups by allowing more than one level of group extension. A group is polycyclic if it has a finite descending sequence of subgroups, each of which is normal in the previous subgroup with a cyclic quotient, ending in the trivial group. Every finitely generated abelian group or nilpotent group is polycyclic.

== See also ==
- Cycle graph (group)
- Cyclic module
- Cyclic sieving
- Circle group (uncountably infinite analogue)
- Prüfer group (countably infinite analogue)
