= Tensor product (disambiguation) =

Tensor product refers to one of several related binary operations, typically denoted $- \otimes -$. Usually, they are associative, unital, and symmetric (up to some appropriate kind of structural equivalence).

It may refer to:

- Tensor product of vector spaces, an operation on vector spaces (the original tensor product)
  - Tensor product of modules, the same operation slightly generalized to modules over arbitrary rings
  - Kronecker product, the tensor product of matrices (or vectors), which satisfies all the properties for vector spaces and allows a concrete representation
  - Tensor product of Hilbert spaces, endowed with a special inner product as to remain a Hilbert space
    - Other topological tensor products
- Tensor product of graphs, an operation on graphs, whose adjacency matrices are the Kronecker product of the component adjacency matrices
- Tensor product of algebras (or rings), on algebras over a field (or other commutative ring)
  - Tensor product of representations, a special case in representation theory
  - Tensor product of fields, an operation on fields—unlike most tensor products, the category of fields is not closed with respect to this operation (i.e., sometimes the product is not a field)
- "Categorified" concepts, applied "pointwise" on objects and morphisms:
  - Tensor product of vector bundles
  - Tensor product of sheaves of modules, essentially the same thing
  - Tensor product of functors

Categories closed under a suitable tensor product are called "monoidal categories". Special types of monoidal categories exist with interesting properties.
