= Product of rings =

Ring built from other rings (mathematics)

In mathematics, a product of rings or direct product of rings is a ring that is formed by the Cartesian product of the underlying sets of several rings (possibly an infinity), equipped with componentwise operations. It is a direct product in the category of rings.

Since direct products are defined up to an isomorphism, one says colloquially that a ring is the product of some rings if it is isomorphic to the direct product of these rings. For example, the Chinese remainder theorem may be stated as: if m and n are coprime integers, the quotient ring $\Z/mn\Z$ is the product of $\Z/m\Z$ and $\Z/n\Z.$

== Examples ==
An important example is Z/nZ, the ring of integers modulo n. If n is written as a product of prime powers (see Fundamental theorem of arithmetic),

$$n=p_1^{n_1} p_2^{n_2}\cdots\ p_k^{n_k},$$

where the p_{i} are distinct primes, then Z/nZ is naturally isomorphic to the product

$$\mathbf{Z}/p_1^{n_1}\mathbf{Z} \ \times \ \mathbf{Z}/p_2^{n_2}\mathbf{Z} \ \times \ \cdots \ \times \ \mathbf{Z}/p_k^{n_k}\mathbf{Z}.$$

This follows from the Chinese remainder theorem.

== Properties ==
If R = Π_{i∈I} R_{i} is a product of rings, then for every i in I we have a surjective ring homomorphism p_{i} : R → R_{i} which projects the product on the ith coordinate. The product R together with the projections p_{i} has the following universal property:

if S is any ring and f_{i} : S → R_{i} is a ring homomorphism for every i in I, then there exists precisely one ring homomorphism f : S → R such that p_{i} ∘ f = f_{i} for every i in I.

This shows that the product of rings is an instance of products in the sense of category theory.

When I is finite, the underlying additive group of Π_{i∈I} R_{i} coincides with the direct sum of the additive groups of the R_{i}. In this case, some authors call R the "direct sum of the rings R_{i}" and write ⊕_{i∈I} R_{i}, but this is incorrect from the point of view of category theory, since it is usually not a coproduct in the category of rings (with identity): for example, when two or more of the R_{i} are non-trivial, the inclusion map R_{i} → R fails to map 1 to 1 and hence is not a ring homomorphism.

(A finite coproduct in the category of commutative algebras over a commutative ring is a tensor product of algebras. A coproduct in the category of algebras is a free product of algebras.)

Direct products are commutative and associative up to natural isomorphism, meaning that it doesn't matter in which order one forms the direct product.

If A_{i} is an ideal of R_{i} for each i in I, then A = Π_{i∈I} A_{i} is an ideal of R. If I is finite, then the converse is true, i.e., every ideal of R is of this form. However, if I is infinite and the rings R_{i} are non-trivial, then the converse is false: the set of elements with all but finitely many nonzero coordinates forms an ideal which is not a direct product of ideals of the R_{i}. The ideal A is a prime ideal in R if all but one of the A_{i} are equal to R_{i} and the remaining A_{i} is a prime ideal in R_{i}. However, the converse is not true when I is infinite. For example, the direct sum of the R_{i} form an ideal not contained in any such A, but the axiom of choice gives that it is contained in some maximal ideal which is a fortiori prime.

An element x in R is a unit if and only if all of its components are units, i.e., if and only if p_{i}(x) is a unit in R_{i} for every i in I. The group of units of R is the product of the groups of units of the R_{i}.

A product of two or more non-trivial rings always has nonzero zero divisors: if x is an element of the product whose coordinates are all zero except p_{i}(x) and y is an element of the product with all coordinates zero except p_{j}(y) where i ≠ j, then xy = 0 in the product ring.
