= Biproduct =

Object that is both a product and coproduct

In category theory and its applications to mathematics, a biproduct of a finite collection of objects, in a category with zero objects, is both a product and a coproduct. In a preadditive category the notions of product and coproduct coincide for finite collections of objects. The biproduct is a generalization of finite direct sums of modules.

== Definition ==
Let C be a category with zero morphisms. Given a finite (possibly empty) collection of objects A_{1}, ..., A_{n} in C, their biproduct is an object $A_1 \oplus \dots \oplus A_n$ in C together with morphisms

- $p_k \!: A_1 \oplus \dots \oplus A_n \to A_k$ in C (the projection morphisms)
- $i_k \!: A_k \to A_1 \oplus \dots \oplus A_n$ (the embedding morphisms)

satisfying

- $p_k \circ i_k = 1_{A_k}$, the identity morphism of $A_k,$ and
- $p_l \circ i_k = 0$, the zero morphism $A_k \to A_l,$ for $k \neq l,$

and such that

- $\left( A_1 \oplus \dots \oplus A_n, p_k \right)$ is a product for the $A_k,$ and
- $\left( A_1 \oplus \dots \oplus A_n, i_k \right)$ is a coproduct for the $A_k.$

If C is preadditive and the first two conditions hold, then each of the last two conditions is equivalent to $i_1 \circ p_1 + \dots + i_n\circ p_n = 1_{A_1 \oplus \dots \oplus A_n}$ when n > 0. An empty, or nullary, product is always a terminal object in the category, and the empty coproduct is always an initial object in the category. Thus an empty, or nullary, biproduct is always a zero object.

== Examples ==
In the category of abelian groups, biproducts always exist and are given by the direct sum. The zero object is the trivial group.

Similarly, biproducts exist in the category of vector spaces over a field. The biproduct is again the direct sum, and the zero object is the trivial vector space.

More generally, biproducts exist in the category of modules over a ring.

On the other hand, biproducts do not exist in the category of groups. Here, the product is the direct product, but the coproduct is the free product.

Also, biproducts do not exist in the category of sets. For, the product is given by the Cartesian product, whereas the coproduct is given by the disjoint union. This category does not have a zero object.

Block matrix algebra relies upon biproducts in categories of matrices.

== Properties ==
If the biproduct $A \oplus B$ exists for all pairs of objects A and B in the category C, and C has a zero object, then all finite biproducts exist, making C both a Cartesian monoidal category and a co-Cartesian monoidal category.

If C is a preadditive category, then every finite product is a biproduct, and every finite coproduct is a biproduct. For example, if $A_1 \times A_2$ exists, then there are unique morphisms $i_k: A_k \to A_1 \times A_2$ such that

- $p_k \circ i_k = 1_{A_k},\ (k = 1, 2)$
- $p_l \circ i_k = 0$ for $k \neq l.$

To see that $A_1 \times A_2$ is now also a coproduct, and hence a biproduct, suppose we have morphisms $f_k: A_k \to X,\ k=1,2$ for some object $X$. Define $f := f_1 \circ p_1 + f_2 \circ p_2.$ Then $f$ is a morphism from $A_1 \times A_2$ to $X$, and $f \circ i_k = f_k$ for $k = 1, 2$.

In this case, $i_1 \circ p_1 + i_2 \circ p_2 = 1_{A_1 \times A_2}$.

An additive category is a preadditive category in which all finite biproducts exist. In particular, biproducts always exist in abelian categories.
