= Coinduced =

Coinduced may refer to:

- Coinduced topology
- Coinduced module
