= Tensor product of algebras =

Tensor product of algebras over a field; itself another algebra

In mathematics, the tensor product of two algebras over a commutative ring R is also an R-algebra. This gives the tensor product of algebras. When the ring is a field, the most common application of such products is to describe the product of algebra representations.

== Definition ==
Let R be a commutative ring and let A and B be R-algebras. Since A and B may both be regarded as R-modules, their tensor product

$$A \otimes_R B$$

is also an R-module. The tensor product can be given the structure of a ring by defining the product on elements of the form a ⊗ b by

$$(a_1\otimes b_1)(a_2\otimes b_2) = a_1 a_2\otimes b_1b_2$$

and then extending by linearity to all of A ⊗_{R} B. This ring is an R-algebra, associative and unital with the identity element given by 1_{A} ⊗ 1_{B}, where 1_{A} and 1_{B} are the identity elements of A and B. If A and B are commutative, then the tensor product is commutative as well.

The tensor product turns the category of R-algebras into a symmetric monoidal category.

== Further properties ==
There are natural homomorphisms from A and B to A ⊗_{R} B given by

$$a\mapsto a\otimes 1_B$$
$$b\mapsto 1_A\otimes b$$

These maps make the tensor product the coproduct in the category of commutative R-algebras. The tensor product is not the coproduct in the category of all R-algebras; there the coproduct is given by a more general free product of algebras. Nevertheless, the tensor product of non-commutative algebras can be described by a universal property similar to that of the coproduct:

$$\text{Hom}(A\otimes B,X) \cong \lbrace (f,g)\in \text{Hom}(A,X)\times \text{Hom}(B,X) \mid \forall a \in A, b \in B: [f(a), g(b)] = 0\rbrace,$$

where [-, -] denotes the commutator. The natural isomorphism is given by identifying a morphism $\phi:A\otimes B\to X$ on the left hand side with the pair of morphisms $(f,g)$ on the right hand side where $f(a):=\phi(a\otimes 1)$ and similarly $g(b):=\phi(1\otimes b)$.

== Applications ==
The tensor product of commutative algebras is of frequent use in algebraic geometry. For affine schemes X, Y, Z with morphisms from X and Z to Y, so X = Spec(A), Y = Spec(R), and Z = Spec(B) for some commutative rings A, R, B, the fiber product scheme is the affine scheme corresponding to the tensor product of algebras:

$$X\times_Y Z = \operatorname{Spec}(A\otimes_R B).$$

More generally, the fiber product of schemes is defined by gluing together affine fiber products of this form.

== Examples ==
- The tensor product can be used as a means of taking intersections of two subschemes in a scheme: consider the $\mathbb{C}[x,y]$-algebras $\mathbb{C}[x,y]/f$, $\mathbb{C}[x,y]/g$, then their tensor product is $\mathbb{C}[x,y]/(f) \otimes_{\mathbb{C}[x,y]} \mathbb{C}[x,y]/(g) \cong \mathbb{C}[x,y]/(f,g)$, which describes the intersection of the algebraic curves f = 0 and g = 0 in the affine plane over C.
- More generally, if $A$ is a commutative ring and $I,J\subseteq A$ are ideals, then $\frac{A}{I}\otimes_A\frac{A}{J}\cong \frac{A}{I+J}$, with a unique isomorphism sending $(a+I) \otimes (b+J)$ to $ab + I+J$.
- Tensor products can be used as a means of changing coefficients. For example, $\mathbb{Z}[x,y]/(x^3 + 5x^2 + x - 1)\otimes_\mathbb{Z} \mathbb{Z}/5 \cong \mathbb{Z}/5[x,y]/(x^3 + x - 1)$ and $\mathbb{Z}[x,y]/(f) \otimes_\mathbb{Z} \mathbb{C} \cong \mathbb{C}[x,y]/(f)$.
- Tensor products also can be used for taking products of affine schemes over a field. For example, $\mathbb{C}[x_1,x_2]/(f(x)) \otimes_\mathbb{C} \mathbb{C}[y_1,y_2]/(g(y))$ is isomorphic to the algebra $\mathbb{C}[x_1,x_2,y_1,y_2]/(f(x),g(y))$ which corresponds to an affine surface in $\mathbb{A}^4_\mathbb{C}$ if f and g are not zero.
- Given $R$-algebras $A$ and $B$ whose underlying rings are graded-commutative rings, the tensor product $A\otimes_RB$ becomes a graded commutative ring by defining $(a\otimes b)(a'\otimes b')=(-1)^{|b||a'|}aa'\otimes bb'$ for homogeneous $a$, $a'$, $b$, and $b'$.
- The tensor product of two matrix algebras is $M_m(A)\otimes_AM_n(A)\cong M_{mn}(A)$, the isomorphism given by extending the Kronecker product of two matrices via the universal property.

== See also ==
- Brauer group
- Extension of scalars
- Tensor product of modules
- Tensor product of fields
- Linearly disjoint
- Multilinear subspace learning
