= Eilenberg–Watts theorem =

Theorem in algebra

In mathematics, specifically homological algebra, the Eilenberg–Watts theorem tells when a functor between the categories of modules is given by an application of a tensor product. Precisely, it says that a functor $F : \mathbf{Mod}_R \to \mathbf{Mod}_S$ is additive, is right-exact and preserves coproducts if and only if it is of the form $F \simeq - \otimes_R F(R)$.

For a proof, see The theorems of Eilenberg & Watts (Part 1)
