= Bimodule =

Abelian group equipped with compatible ring action on both sides

In abstract algebra, a bimodule is an abelian group that is both a left and a right module, such that the left and right multiplications are compatible. Besides appearing naturally in many parts of mathematics, bimodules play a clarifying role, in the sense that many of the relationships between left and right modules become simpler when they are expressed in terms of bimodules.

== Definition ==
If R and S are two rings, then an R-S-bimodule is an abelian group (M, +) such that:

1. M is a left R-module with an operation · and a right S-module with an operation $*$.
2. For all r in R, s in S and m in M:
  $$(r\cdot m)*s = r\cdot (m*s) .$$

An R-R-bimodule is also known as an R-bimodule.

== Examples ==
- For positive integers n and m, the set M_{n,m}(R) of n × m matrices of real numbers is an R-S-bimodule, where R is the ring M_{n}(R) of n × n matrices, and S is the ring M_{m}(R) of m × m matrices. Addition and multiplication are carried out using the usual rules of matrix addition and matrix multiplication; the heights and widths of the matrices have been chosen so that multiplication is defined. Note that M_{n,m}(R) itself is not a ring (unless n = m), because multiplying an n × m matrix by another n × m matrix is not defined. The crucial bimodule property, that (r.x).s = r.(x.s), is the statement that multiplication of matrices is associative (which, in the case of a matrix ring, corresponds to associativity).
- Any algebra A over a ring R has the natural structure of an R-bimodule, with left and right multiplication defined by r.a = φ(r)a and a.r = aφ(r) respectively, where φ : R → A is the canonical embedding of R into A.
- If R is a ring, then R itself can be considered to be an R-R-bimodule by taking the left and right actions to be multiplication – the actions commute by associativity. This can be extended to R^{n} (the n-fold direct product of R).
- Any two-sided ideal of a ring R is an R-R-bimodule, with the ring multiplication both as the left and as the right multiplication.
- Any module over a commutative ring R has the natural structure of a bimodule. For example, if M is a left module, we can define multiplication on the right to be the same as multiplication on the left. (However, not all R-bimodules arise this way: other compatible right multiplications may exist.)
- If M is a left R-module, then M is an R-Z-bimodule, where Z is the ring of integers. Similarly, right R-modules may be interpreted as Z-R-bimodules. Any abelian group may be treated as a Z-Z-bimodule.
- If M is a right R-module, then the set End_{R}(M) of R-module endomorphisms is a ring with the multiplication given by composition. The endomorphism ring End_{R}(M) acts on M by left multiplication defined by f.x = f(x). The bimodule property, that (f.x).r = f.(x.r), restates that f is a R-module homomorphism from M to itself. Therefore any right R-module M is an End_{R}(M)-R-bimodule. Similarly any left R-module N is an R-End_{R}(N)^{op}-bimodule.
- If R is a subring of S, then S is an R-R-bimodule. It is also an R-S- and an S-R-bimodule.
- If M is an S-R-bimodule and N is an R-T-bimodule, then M ⊗_{R} N is an S-T-bimodule.

== Further notions and facts ==
If M and N are R-S-bimodules, then a map f : M → N is a bimodule homomorphism if it is both a homomorphism of left R-modules and of right S-modules.

An R-S-bimodule is actually the same thing as a left module over the ring R ⊗_{Z} S^{op}, where S^{op} is the opposite ring of S (where the multiplication is defined with the arguments exchanged). Bimodule homomorphisms are the same as homomorphisms of left R ⊗_{Z} S^{op} modules. Using these facts, many definitions and statements about modules can be immediately translated into definitions and statements about bimodules. For example, the category of all R-S-bimodules is abelian, and the standard isomorphism theorems are valid for bimodules.

There are however some new effects in the world of bimodules, especially when it comes to the tensor product: if M is an R-S-bimodule and N is an S-T-bimodule, then the tensor product of M and N (taken over the ring S) is an R-T-bimodule in a natural fashion. This tensor product of bimodules is associative (up to a unique canonical isomorphism), and one can hence construct a category whose objects are the rings and whose morphisms are the bimodules. This is in fact a 2-category, in a canonical way – 2 morphisms between R-S-bimodules M and N are exactly bimodule homomorphisms, i.e. functions

$$f: M \rightarrow N$$

that satisfy

1. $f(m+m') = f(m)+ f(m')$
2. $f(r.m.s) = r.f(m).s$,

for m ∈ M, r ∈ R, and s ∈ S. One immediately verifies the interchange law for bimodule homomorphisms, i.e.

$$(f'\otimes g')\circ (f\otimes g) = (f'\circ f)\otimes(g'\circ g)$$

holds whenever either (and hence the other) side of the equation is defined, and where $\circ$ is the usual composition of homomorphisms. In this interpretation, the category End(R) = Bimod(R, R) is exactly the monoidal category of R-R-bimodules with the usual tensor product over R the tensor product of the category. In particular, if R is a commutative ring, every left or right R-module is canonically an R-R-bimodule, which gives a monoidal embedding of the category R-Mod into Bimod(R, R). The case that R is a field K is a motivating example of a symmetric monoidal category, in which case R-Mod = K-Vect, the category of vector spaces over K, with the usual tensor product ⊗ = ⊗_{K} giving the monoidal structure, and with unit K. We also see that a monoid in Bimod(R, R) is exactly an R-algebra. Furthermore, if M is an R-S-bimodule and L is an T-S-bimodule, then the set Hom_{S}(M, L) of all S-module homomorphisms from M to L becomes a T-R-bimodule in a natural fashion. These statements extend to the derived functors Ext and Tor.

Profunctors can be seen as a categorical generalization of bimodules.

Note that bimodules are not at all related to bialgebras.

== See also ==
- Profunctor
