= Free product of associative algebras =

In algebra, the free product (coproduct) of a family of associative algebras $A_i, i \in I$ over a commutative ring R is the associative algebra over R that is, roughly, defined by the generators and the relations of the $A_i$'s. The free product of two algebras A, B is denoted by A ∗ B. The notion is a ring-theoretic analog of a free product of groups.

In the category of commutative R-algebras, the free product of two algebras (in that category) is their tensor product.

== Construction ==
We first define a free product of two algebras. Let A and B be algebras over a commutative ring R. Consider their tensor algebra, the direct sum of all possible finite tensor products of A, B; explicitly, $T = \bigoplus_{n=1}^{\infty} T_n$ where

$$T_1 = A \oplus B, \,\, T_2 = (A \otimes A) \oplus (A \otimes B) \oplus (B \otimes A) \oplus (B \otimes B), \, \dots$$

We then set

$$A * B = T/I$$

where I is the two-sided ideal generated by elements of the form

$$a \otimes a' - a a', \, b \otimes b' - bb', \, 1_A - 1_B.$$

It is then straightforward to verify that the above construction possesses the universal property of a coproduct.

A finite free product is defined similarly.
