= Category of modules =

Category whose objects are R-modules and whose morphisms are module homomorphisms

In algebra, given a ring $R$, the category of left modules over $R$ is the category whose objects are all left modules over $R$ and whose morphisms are all module homomorphisms between left $R$-modules. For example, when $R$ is the ring of integers $\mathbb{Z}$, it is the same thing as the category of abelian groups. The category of right modules is defined in a similar way.

One can also define the category of bimodules over a ring $R$ but that category is equivalent to the category of left (or right) modules over the enveloping algebra of $R$ (or over the opposite of that).

Note: Some authors use the term module category for the category of modules. This term can be ambiguous since it could also refer to a category with a monoidal-category action.

== Properties ==
The categories of left and right modules are abelian categories. These categories have enough projectives and enough injectives. Mitchell's embedding theorem states every abelian category arises as a full subcategory of the category of modules over some ring.

Projective limits and inductive limits exist in the categories of left and right modules.

Over a commutative ring, together with the tensor product of modules $\otimes$, the category of modules is a symmetric monoidal category.

== Objects ==
A monoid object of the category of modules over a commutative ring $R$ is exactly an associative algebra over $R$.

A compact object in $R$-$\mathbf{Mod}$ is exactly a finitely presented module.

== Category of vector spaces ==
The category $K\text{-}\mathbf{Vect}$ (some authors use $\mathbf{Vect}_K$) has all vector spaces over a field $K$ as objects, and $K$-linear maps as morphisms. Since vector spaces over $K$ (as a field) are the same thing as modules over the ring $K$, $K\text{-}\mathbf{Vect}$ is a special case of $R$-$\mathbf{Mod}$ (some authors use $\mathbf{Mod}_R$), the category of left $R$-modules.

Much of linear algebra concerns the description of $K\text{-}\mathbf{Vect}$. For example, the dimension theorem for vector spaces says that the isomorphism classes in $K\text{-}\mathbf{Vect}$ correspond exactly to the cardinal numbers, and that $K\text{-}\mathbf{Vect}$ is equivalent to the subcategory of $K\text{-}\mathbf{Vect}$ which has as its objects the vector spaces $K_n$, where $n$ is any cardinal number.

== Generalizations ==
The category of sheaves of modules over a ringed space also has enough injectives (though not always enough projectives).

== See also ==
- Algebraic K-theory (the important invariant of the category of modules.)
- Category of rings
- Derived category
- Module spectrum
- Category of graded vector spaces
- Category of representations
- Change of rings
- Morita equivalence
- Stable module category
- Eilenberg–Watts theorem
