= Category of rings =

Category whose objects are rings and whose morphisms are ring homomorphisms

In mathematics, the category of rings, denoted by Ring, is the category whose objects are rings (with identity) and whose morphisms are ring homomorphisms (that preserve the identity). Like many categories in mathematics, the category of rings is large, meaning that the class of all rings is proper.

== As a concrete category ==
The category Ring is a concrete category meaning that the objects are sets with additional structure (addition and multiplication) and the morphisms are functions that preserve this structure. There is a natural forgetful functor

U : Ring → Set

for the category of rings to the category of sets which sends each ring to its underlying set (thus "forgetting" the operations of addition and multiplication). This functor has a left adjoint

F : Set → Ring

which assigns to each set X the free ring generated by X.

One can also view the category of rings as a concrete category over Ab (the category of abelian groups) or over Mon (the category of monoids). Specifically, there are forgetful functors

A : Ring → Ab
M : Ring → Mon

which "forget" multiplication and addition, respectively. Both of these functors have left adjoints. The left adjoint of A is the functor which assigns to every abelian group X (thought of as a Z-module) the tensor ring T(X). The left adjoint of M is the functor which assigns to every monoid X the integral monoid ring Z[X].

== Properties ==
=== Limits and colimits ===
The category Ring is both complete and cocomplete, meaning that all small limits and colimits exist in Ring. Like many other algebraic categories, the forgetful functor U : Ring → Set creates (and preserves) limits and filtered colimits, but does not preserve either coproducts or coequalizers. The forgetful functors to Ab and Mon also create and preserve limits.

Examples of limits and colimits in Ring include:

- The ring of integers Z is an initial object in Ring.
- The zero ring is a terminal object in Ring.
- The product in Ring is given by the direct product of rings. This is just the cartesian product of the underlying sets with addition and multiplication defined component-wise.
- The coproduct of a family of rings exists and is given by a construction analogous to the free product of groups. The coproduct of nonzero rings can be the zero ring; in particular, this happens whenever the factors have relatively prime characteristic (since the characteristic of the coproduct of (R_{i})_{i∈I} must divide the characteristics of each of the rings R_{i}).
- The equalizer in Ring is just the set-theoretic equalizer (the equalizer of two ring homomorphisms is always a subring).
- The coequalizer of two ring homomorphisms f and g from R to S is the quotient of S by the ideal generated by all elements of the form f(r) − g(r) for r ∈ R.
- Given a ring homomorphism f : R → S the kernel pair of f (this is just the pullback of f with itself) is a congruence relation on R. The ideal determined by this congruence relation is precisely the (ring-theoretic) kernel of f. Note that category-theoretic kernels do not make sense in Ring since there are no zero morphisms (see below).

=== Morphisms ===
Unlike many categories studied in mathematics, there do not always exist morphisms between pairs of objects in Ring. This is a consequence of the fact that ring homomorphisms must preserve the identity. For example, there are no morphisms from the zero ring 0 to any nonzero ring. A necessary condition for there to be morphisms from R to S is that the characteristic of S divide that of R.

Note that even though some of the hom-sets are empty, the category Ring is still connected since it has an initial object.

Some special classes of morphisms in Ring include:

- Isomorphisms in Ring are the bijective ring homomorphisms.
- Monomorphisms in Ring are the injective homomorphisms. Not every monomorphism is regular however.
- Every surjective homomorphism is an epimorphism in Ring, but the converse is not true. The inclusion Z → Q is a nonsurjective epimorphism. The natural ring homomorphism from any commutative ring R to any one of its localizations is an epimorphism which is not necessarily surjective.
- The surjective homomorphisms can be characterized as the regular or extremal epimorphisms in Ring (these two classes coinciding).
- Bimorphisms in Ring are the injective epimorphisms. The inclusion Z → Q is an example of a bimorphism which is not an isomorphism.

=== Other properties ===
- The only injective object in Ring up to isomorphism is the zero ring (i.e. the terminal object).
- Lacking zero morphisms, the category of rings cannot be a preadditive category. (However, every ring—considered as a category with a single object—is a preadditive category).
- The category of rings is a symmetric monoidal category with the tensor product of rings ⊗_{Z} as the monoidal product and the ring of integers Z as the unit object. It follows from the Eckmann–Hilton theorem, that a monoid in Ring is a commutative ring. The action of a monoid (= commutative ring) R on an object (= ring) A of Ring is an R-algebra.

== Subcategories ==
The category of rings has a number of important subcategories. These include the full subcategories of commutative rings, integral domains, principal ideal domains, and fields.

=== Category of commutative rings ===
The category of commutative rings, denoted CRing, is the full subcategory of Ring whose objects are all commutative rings. This category is one of the central objects of study in the subject of commutative algebra.

Any ring can be made commutative by taking the quotient by the ideal generated by all elements of the form (xy − yx). This defines a functor Ring → CRing which is left adjoint to the inclusion functor, so that CRing is a reflective subcategory of Ring. The free commutative ring on a set of generators E is the polynomial ring Z[E] whose variables are taken from E. This gives a left adjoint functor to the forgetful functor from CRing to Set.

CRing is limit-closed in Ring, which means that limits in CRing are the same as they are in Ring. Colimits, however, are generally different. They can be formed by taking the commutative quotient of colimits in Ring. The coproduct of two commutative rings is given by the tensor product of rings. Again, the coproduct of two nonzero commutative rings can be zero.

The opposite category of CRing is equivalent to the category of affine schemes. The equivalence is given by the contravariant functor Spec which sends a commutative ring to its spectrum, an affine scheme.

=== Category of fields ===
The category of fields, denoted Field, is the full subcategory of CRing whose objects are fields. The category of fields is not nearly as well-behaved as other algebraic categories. In particular, free fields do not exist (i.e. there is no left adjoint to the forgetful functor Field → Set). It follows that Field is not a reflective subcategory of CRing.

The category of fields is neither finitely complete nor finitely cocomplete. In particular, Field has neither products nor coproducts.

Another curious aspect of the category of fields is that every morphism is a monomorphism. This follows from the fact that the only ideals in a field F are the zero ideal and F itself. One can then view morphisms in Field as field extensions.

The category of fields is not connected. There are no morphisms between fields of different characteristic. The connected components of Field are the full subcategories of characteristic p, where p = 0 or is a prime number. Each such subcategory has an initial object: the prime field of characteristic p (which is Q if p = 0, otherwise the finite field F_{p}).

== Related categories and functors ==
=== Category of groups ===
There is a natural functor from Ring to the category of groups, Grp, which sends each ring R to its group of units U(R) and each ring homomorphism to the restriction to U(R). This functor has a left adjoint which sends each group G to the integral group ring Z[G].

Another functor between these categories sends each ring R to the group of units of the matrix ring M_{2}(R) which acts on the projective line over a ring P(R).

=== R-algebras ===
Given a commutative ring R one can define the category R-Alg whose objects are all R-algebras and whose morphisms are R-algebra homomorphisms.

The category of rings can be considered a special case. Every ring can be considered a Z-algebra in a unique way. Ring homomorphisms are precisely the Z-algebra homomorphisms. The category of rings is, therefore, isomorphic to the category Z-Alg. Many statements about the category of rings can be generalized to statements about the category of R-algebras.

For each commutative ring R there is a functor R-Alg → Ring which forgets the R-module structure. This functor has a left adjoint which sends each ring A to the tensor product R⊗_{Z}A, thought of as an R-algebra by setting r·(s⊗a) = rs⊗a.

=== Rings without identity ===
Many authors do not require rings to have a multiplicative identity element and, accordingly, do not require ring homomorphism to preserve the identity (should it exist). This leads to a rather different category. For distinction we call such algebraic structures rngs and their morphisms rng homomorphisms. The category of all rngs will be denoted by Rng.

The category of rings, Ring, is a nonfull subcategory of Rng. It is nonfull because there are rng homomorphisms between rings which do not preserve the identity, and are therefore not morphisms in Ring. The inclusion functor Ring → Rng has a left adjoint which formally adjoins an identity to any rng. The inclusion functor Ring → Rng respects limits but not colimits.

The zero ring serves as both an initial and terminal object in Rng (that is, it is a zero object). It follows that Rng, like Grp but unlike Ring, has zero morphisms. These are just the rng homomorphisms that map everything to 0. Despite the existence of zero morphisms, Rng is still not a preadditive category. The pointwise sum of two rng homomorphisms is generally not a rng homomorphism.

There is a fully faithful functor from the category of abelian groups to Rng sending an abelian group to the associated rng of square zero.

Free constructions are less natural in Rng than they are in Ring. For example, the free rng generated by a set {x} is the ring of all integral polynomials over x with no constant term, while the free ring generated by {x} is just the polynomial ring Z[x].
