= Change of rings =

Operation in algebra

In algebra, change of rings refers to one of several related ways for changing the coefficient ring of a module. Given (possibly non-commutative) unital rings $R$ and $S$ and a ring homorphism $\rho : R \to S$,

- restriction of scalars turns an $S$-module $V$ into an $R$-module $\rho^* V$.
- extension of scalars turns an $R$-module $V$ into an $S$-module $\rho_! V$, the induced module.
- coextension of scalars turns an $R$-module $V$ into an $S$-module $\rho_* V$, the coinduced module.

In this article we describe the constructions on left modules, although all constructions work for right modules mutatis mutandis. Each of these constructions extends to a functor, so that we have an adjoint triple

where ${}_R\mathsf{Mod}$ and ${}_S\mathsf{Mod}$ are the categories of left $R$- and $S$-modules respectively.

== Restriction of scalars ==
Of the three constructions named above, restriction of scalars is the easiest to describe. Suppose that $V$ is a left $S$-module. Then $V$ it can be regarded as an $R$-module $\rho^* V$ with the pullback $R$-action

$$\begin{align}
R \times V &\longrightarrow V \\
(x , v)    &\longmapsto \rho(x) \cdot v
\end{align}$$

where $\rho(x) \cdot v$ denotes the action defined by the $S$-module structure on $V$.

=== Functoriality ===
Restriction of scalars $\rho^* : {}_S\mathsf{Mod} \to {}_R\mathsf{Mod}$ extends to a functor between categories of modules. Any $S$-morphism $f : V \to W$automatically becomes an $R$-morphism between the restrictions of $V$ and $W$. Indeed, if $v \in V$ and $x \in R$, then

$$f(xv) = f(\rho(x) \cdot v) = \rho(x) \cdot f(v) = x \cdot f(v)$$.

If $R$ is the ring of integers, then this is just the forgetful functor from modules to abelian groups.

== Extension of scalars ==
Let ${}_SS{}_R$ denote $S$ regarded as an $(S,R)$-bimodule, where $s_1 \cdot s_2 \cdot r = s_1\,s_2\,\rho(r)$ for $s_1,s_2 \in S$ and $r \in R$. For a given left $R$-module $V$, the induced module $\rho_!V$ is defined as the tensor product of bimodules

$$\begin{align}
\rho_!V = {}_SS_R \otimes_R V,
\end{align}$$

which is to say $\rho_!V$ has the left $S$-action defined by $s_1 \cdot (s_2 \otimes v) = s_1s_2 \otimes v$ for $s_1,s_2 \in S$ and $v \in V$.

=== Functoriality ===
Extension of scalars $\rho_! : {}_R\mathsf{Mod} \to {}_S\mathsf{Mod}$ extends to a functor between categories of modules, so that if $f : V \to W$ is an $R$-morphism then $\rho_! V = {}_SS_R \otimes_R f$. As a functor, $\rho_!$ is determined up to natural isomorphism as the left adjoint of $\rho^* : {}_S\mathsf{Mod} \to {}_R\mathsf{Mod}$, with unit of adjunction

$$\begin{align}
\eta_V : V &\to \rho^* \rho_!V \\
v &\mapsto 1 \otimes v.
\end{align}$$

Unfurling the corresponding universal property, this means that for any left $R$-module $V$, left $S$-module $W$, and $R$-morphism $f : V \to \rho^* W$, there exists a unique $S$-morphism $f^\sharp : \rho_* V \to W$ such that $\rho^* f^\sharp \circ \eta_V = f$.

=== Examples ===
One of the simplest examples is complexification, which is extension of scalars from the real numbers to the complex numbers. More generally, given any field extension K < L, one can extend scalars from K to L. In the language of fields, a module over a field is called a vector space, and thus extension of scalars converts a vector space over K to a vector space over L. This can also be done for division algebras, as is done in quaternionification (extension from the reals to the quaternions).

More generally, given a homomorphism from a field or commutative ring R to a ring S, the ring S can be thought of as an associative algebra over R, and thus when one extends scalars on an R-module, the resulting module can be thought of alternatively as an S-module, or as an R-module with an algebra representation of S (as an R-algebra). For example, the result of complexifying a real vector space (R = R, S = C) can be interpreted either as a complex vector space (S-module) or as a real vector space with a linear complex structure (algebra representation of S as an R-module).

=== Applications ===
This generalization is useful even for the study of fields – notably, many algebraic objects associated to a field are not themselves fields, but are instead rings, such as algebras over a field, as in representation theory. Just as one can extend scalars on vector spaces, one can also extend scalars on group algebras and also on modules over group algebras, i.e., group representations. Particularly useful is relating how irreducible representations change under extension of scalars – for example, the representation of the cyclic group of order 4, given by rotation of the plane by 90°, is an irreducible 2-dimensional real representation, but on extension of scalars to the complex numbers, it splits into 2 complex representations of dimension 1. This corresponds to the fact that the characteristic polynomial of this operator, $x^2+1,$ is irreducible of degree 2 over the reals, but factors into 2 factors of degree 1 over the complex numbers – it has no real eigenvalues, but 2 complex eigenvalues.

== Coextension of scalars ==
Let ${}_RS$ denote $S$ regarded as a left $R$-module, where $r \cdot s = \rho(r)\,s$ for $r \in R$ and $s \in S$. For a given left $R$-module $V$, the underlying abelian group of the coinduced module $\rho_* V$ is ${}_R\mathsf{Mod}({}_RS, V)$, consisting of $R$-morphisms ${}_RS \to V$. The $S$-action on $\rho_*V$ is defined by $(s_1f)(s_2) = f(s_2s_1)$ for $s_1,s_2 \in S$ and $v \in V$.

=== Functoriality ===
Coextension of scalars $\rho_* : {}_R\mathsf{Mod} \to {}_S\mathsf{Mod}$ extends to a functor between categories of modules, so that if $g : V \to W$ is an $R$-morphism then $(\rho_* g)(f) = g \circ f$. As a functor, $\rho_*$ is determined up to natural isomorphism as the right adjoint of $\rho^* : {}_S\mathsf{Mod} \to {}_R\mathsf{Mod}$, with counit of adjunction

$$\begin{align}
\epsilon_V : \rho^* \rho_* V &\to V \\
f &\mapsto f(1)
\end{align}$$

Unfurling the corresponding universal property, his means that for any left $R$-module $W$, left $S$-module $V$, and $T$-morphism $f : \rho^* W \to V$, there exists a unique $R$-morphism $f^\flat : W \to \rho^* V$ such that $\epsilon_V \circ \rho^* f^\flat = f$.

== See also ==
- Fiber product of schemes § Base change and descent
- Six operations
- Tensor product of fields
- Tensor-hom adjunction
