= Helmut Ulm =

German mathematician (1908 – 1975)

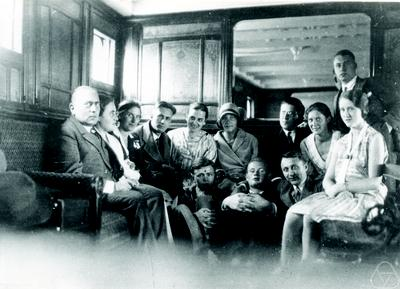
According to the annotation of this photo by Konrad Jacobs, it depicts Otto Toeplitz, E. Hagemann, D. Vieth, H. Ulm, Gottfried Köthe in 1930.

Helmut Ulm (born 21 June 1908 in Gelsenkirchen; died 13 June 1975) was a German mathematician who established the classification of countable periodic abelian groups by means of their Ulm invariants.

== Career ==
Helmut Ulm's father was an elementary school teacher in Elberfeld. After finishing high school in Wuppertal in 1926, he attended the universities of Göttingen (1926–1927), Jena (1927) and Bonn (1927–1930), where he studied mathematics and physics, attending the lectures of Richard Courant, Erich Bessel-Hagen, Felix Hausdorff, and the joint Hausdorff–Otto Toeplitz seminar. He graduated summa cum laude in 1930 with a thesis about countable periodic abelian groups (1933). In 1933–1935 he was an assistant in Göttingen and worked with Wilhelm Magnus and Olga Taussky-Todd editing David Hilbert's Collected Works. His Habilitationsschrift developed a generalization of the elementary divisor theory to infinite matrices, continuing ideas of Ulm's teacher Toeplitz. It was submitted in Münster in 1936 and refereed by Heinrich Behnke, Gottfried Köthe, F. K. Schmidt, and B. L. van der Waerden. Ulm's promotion was delayed, apparently, due to his anti-Nazi views.

From 1935 until his retirement in 1974 Ulm worked at the University of Münster, as an assistant, docent, and eventually professor (1968). Besides his three important papers on the classification of infinite abelian groups, Ulm published only a few notes in the proceedings of the Münster mathematical seminar, one of which dealt with solution of systems of linear equations by a computer. He suffered from poor health. During the World War II, Ulm worked as a cryptographer at Pers Z S starting in August 1941 on a part-time basis from Thursday through to Saturday and on Monday through Wednesday at Münster. After the war he mostly taught courses in applied mathematics and supervised several Ph.D. theses; those of G. Tillmann (1952) and G. Roth (1961) were close to his old work on infinite-dimensional linear algebra and infinite groups.

== Bibliography ==
- Helmut Ulm, Zur Theorie der abzählbar-unendlichen Abelschen Gruppen. Math. Ann. 107, 774–803 (1933) JFM 59.0143.03 Zbl 0006.15003
- Helmut Ulm, Zur Theorie der nicht-abzählbaren primären abelschen Gruppen. Math. Z. 40, 205–207 (1935) Zbl 0011.39307
- Helmut Ulm, Elementarteilertheorie unendlicher Matrizen. Math. Ann. 114, 493–505 (1937) Zbl 0017.09901
