= Young-joo =

- Hangul: 영주
- RR: Yeongju
- MR: Yŏngju

Young-joo, also spelled Young-ju, Yong-joo, or Yong-ju, is a Korean given name.

People with this name include:

- Kim Yong-ju (born 1920), North Korean politician
- Suh Yong-joo (born 1934), South Korean long jumper
- YoungJu Choie (born 1959), South Korean mathematician
- Byun Young-joo (born 1966), South Korean film director
- Sarah Chang (born Young-Joo Chang, 1980), Korean American violinist
- Seo Young-joo (born 1998), South Korean actor

Fictional characters with this name include:

- Joo Young-joo, in 2004 South Korean film Too Beautiful to Lie
- Na Young-joo, in 2018 South Korean television series Where Stars Land

== See also ==
- List of Korean given names
