= Poul la Cour =

Danish scientist, inventor and educationer

Poul la Cour (13 April 1846 – 24 April 1908) was a Danish scientist, inventor and educationalist. Today la Cour is especially recognized for his early work on wind power, both experimental work on aerodynamics and practical implementation of wind power plants. He worked most of his life at Askov Folk High School where he developed the historic genetic method of teaching the sciences. Early in his life he was a telegraphic inventor working with multiplex telegraphy.

== Biography ==
Poul la Cour was born on 13 April 1846 on a farm near Ebeltoft in Denmark. His father was a modern farmer introducing new technology at his farm as the first among neighbours. However la Cour had his gifts in mathematics from his mother. At Latin school in Randers he performed very poorly in languages and had to give up an early wish to become a priest. His brother Jørgen la Cour (1838–98), who knew the possible directions of study in Copenhagen, soon directed his brother into the new field of meteorology.

== Telegraphic inventor ==
After having finished his studies in physics and meteorology in Copenhagen in 1869 Poul la Cour travelled in Europe to study practical meteorology. He received his most important inspiration from the Dutch meteorologist de Buijs Ballot, with whom he spent a month. He became convinced that Denmark should set up a planned meteorological institute according to the principles of de Buijs Ballot. During the next five years his life was closely interwoven with the early history of the Danish Meteorological Institute, which was founded in 1872 with him as a Deputy Director.

Telegraphy, the most important technological prerequisite for modern meteorology, soon became his main interest. In June 1874, the year in which Edison invented his quadruplex telegraphy, la Cour invented a telegraphic device based on tuning forks. The idea was to permit a number of telegraphers to send messages on a single wire, each using his own frequency. By using the resonance phenomenon of tuning forks it was possible to split out the messages at the receiving end of the wire. He patented his invention in London on 2 September 1874, but in the United States Alexander Graham Bell, Elisha Gray and others had been working along similar lines, which resulted in protests against his American patent applications. Having too little money to pay lawyers, he gave up his claim in America, and this invention was credited to Elisha Gray. La Cour however maintained that Gray had been working on the invention of the telephone, and only had changed his invention at the instant la Cour's American application was published. La Cour later wrote in an autobiographical article that he felt some malicious pleasure when Graham Bell was awarded the telephone patent by applying only a few hours before Gray.

In 1876 la Cour could demonstrate 12-fold telegraphy with his system, and the Great Nordic Telegraph company was interested in it for some time. However, only the Danish Railroad Company seems to have used his invention in Denmark. After the disappointment on the American market, he produced a new invention, the phonic wheel: a synchronous motor driven by a tuning fork, which used an electromagnet to rotate the cogwheel of the motor by one tooth for each vibration. With two synchronous phonic wheels at a distance, a multitude of telegraphic devices was possible. This time there were no problems with the patent. The invention was produced in August 1875, patented in 1877, and the details were published in the book The Phonic Wheel in 1878 in a Danish and a French edition. At that time the invention was adopted by the American company The Delany Synchronous multiple Telegraph, and a new fight of priority arose. In 1886 the Franklin Institute awarded la Cour the John Scott Legacy Medal for the phonic wheel and at the same time presented Delany with the Elliott Cresson Medal for the synchronism, a decision la Cour protested against.

The phonic wheel was used (in the form of Delany's multiplex telegraphy) on some telegraph lines on the East Coast of the US, and in the London Post Office. It was used as a chronometer, which was accurate to 0.00004 seconds in short time measurements. The most modern application was in the mechanical "television" of Paul Gottlieb Nipkow (1884).

== The experimental mill at Askov 1891 ==
During the 1880s there had been some criticism of the Grundtvigian historical approach in the Folk High Schools. In particular, the use of Nordic myths and realism gained a stronger position in Askov Højskole. La Cour's historical approach was not criticized much, but he also reread his Grundtvig and claimed that "in fact it is an indication of the power of history that I creates life (now)". In the 1890s la Cour and Askov Folk High School became more concerned with material reality, in teaching as well as in action. La Cour again became an inventor and experimental physicist, working for the benefit of the rural areas, form where most of the students came. Denmark is blessed with a lot of wind, and at a time where electricity was about to be introduced in Denmark, la Cour felt that the wind should contribute to the electrification of the country. In the Netherlands, the idea of electrification by means of windmills had been investigated with negative conclusions, because of their low efficiency, and the problems of storing energy . But these problems had appealed to the inventor and physicist la Cour. In 1891 he got the idea of storing wind as hydrogen (and oxygen) energy by passing the electricity through water and using electrolysis (Power-to-X). He was granted financial support by the Danish Government, and the first experimental mill at Askov was erected in the summer of 1891. La Cour's first task however was to "tame" the wind power, in order to make the mill produce a constant power in order to drive a generator. This was solved by the so-called Kratostate, a differential regulator, which later was simplified ("vippeforlaget") and widely used in electricity producing windmills in the Nordic countries and Germany.

== Electrochemical experiments ==
With assistance from professor Pompeo Garuti of Italy he was able to develop the hydrogen storage system in a few years. Because of his personal contributions to this technology he was granted a monopoly of using Garutis patents in Denmark. From 1895 until 1902 Askov Folk High School was illuminated by a mixture of hydrogen and oxygen, and although the energy originated from the wind, there does not seem to have been a single day without light, thanks to the 12 cubic metres hydrogen tank. The reason why la Cour abandoned this system in 1902 was that he failed to develop a gas engine based on hydrogen as a fuel, although years were spent on experiments. With such a motor electricity could be reproduced, and la Cour soon realized that electricity was the energy medium of the future. He then tried other forms electrochemical energy storage, the idea being to develop prototypes of small cottage industry: from limestone and coal he produced Calcium carbide according to the process of Thomas L Willson and from salt he produced soda lye, sodium hydroxide. This did not turn into cottage industries but gave rise to some small Danish companies "Dansk Acetylen gasværk" og "Dansk elektrolytisk Alkalindustri". His last electrochemical idea was the small scale production of artificial fertilizer using the process just invented by the Norwegians, Kristian Birkeland and Sam Eyde.

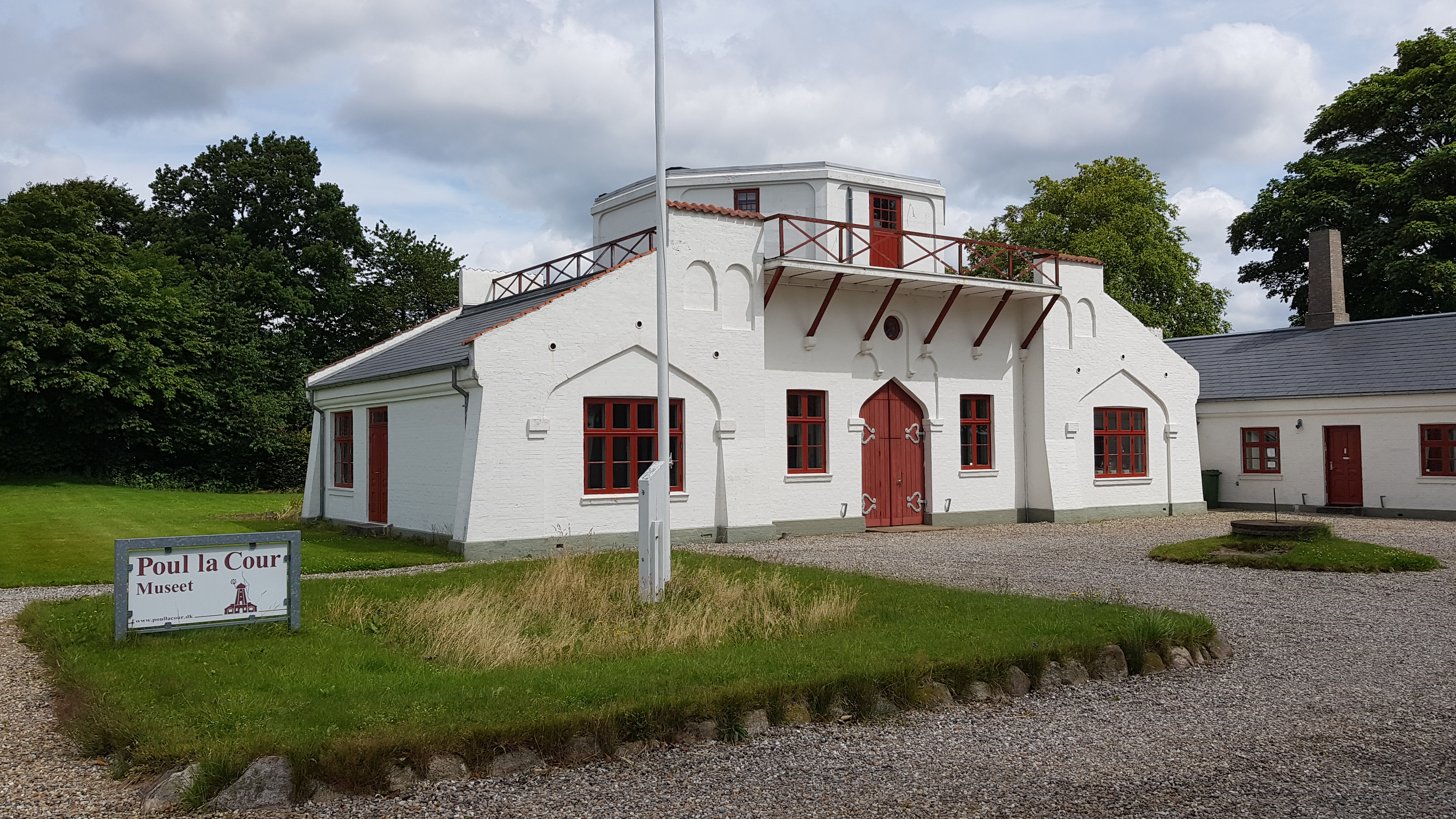
The Poul la Cour Museum in the buildings in Askov where Poul la Cour conducted many of his experiments

== Experiments in aerodynamics 1896–1900 ==
The classical windmills should be able to rotate in a gentle breeze, but the traditional miller was not able to utilize the huge amount of energy in a storm. For la Cour the windmill was a power plant, which should produce a maximum of energy. Therefore, the traditional windmill had to be changed, and that was the background for his experiments in aerodynamics starting in 1896.

Traditional wisdom considered the action of wind on the wings as an impulse of particles, which made Newtonian calculations possible. Although Daniel Bernoulli and Leonhard Euler had laid the foundation of modern fluid dynamics a hundred years earlier this had had no consequence for such complicated practical problems as that of the action of wind on wings; and in the cases where a computation was possible, theory did not match experience (Paradox of d'Alembert). The union of theory and experiment came mainly through careful wind tunnel experiments. The Danish tradition in this area was started by H. C. Vogt and Johan Irminger in the early 1890s. La Cour continued in 1896 when he started to test small models of windmills in a wind tunnel, probably the first such experiments in the world focusing on windmills.

After only a few weeks of experiments la Cour came to the general conclusions that are still accepted: to produce a maximum of energy with a given wing area, the number of wings should be small, their bevel small and the speed of rotation fast. A few years later he presented his results to an audience of engineers: working with the a standard size wing he found that under optimal conditions 8 wings would absorb 28% of the total energy passing swept area, and 16 wings only slightly better (29%), and even 4 wings were fairly good (21%). In a calculation based on the particle conception of wind, he found that the four wings could absorb 144% of the energy which struck them, which of course is impossible. He concluded that in general all former theories and formulae concerning wings seemed to be incorrect; and to the extent they were correct, gave no information of any practical importance to the millwright.

A closer examination of the quality of la Cour's wind tunnel shows that the wind speed varies with a factor 2 form the centre line to the edge, thus putting some inaccuracy to his results. He was probably aware of this defect, for throughout 1899 he was very careful in the experimental setup. He now worked with small wing sections, flat and curved plates, in the middle of the wind tunnel, and measured both size and direction of the resulting force, thereby discovering the advantages of curved profiles. His curved wing could produce a factor 3 better than the flat wing if there was not too much air resistance to take into account.

Based on these experiments he suggested an ideal mill with four times the effect (per wing area) of the average of five existing mills which he had measured. When he actually in 1899 built a new mill in Askov it was only twice as effective, because of a 7% resistance area. In 1929, only twenty years after la Cour's death, a new Askov mill was built directly according to la Cour's "ideal" and this time the factor 4 was obtained. For comparison, windmills today are about 3 times as effective as the 1929 mill. Needless to say there are some assumptions and problems with all these comparisons, but they do indicate that an important step forward was made by la Cour.

== Popular technical enlightenment ==
The fact that la Cour's ideal mill looked very much like the traditional Dutch windmill resulted in some criticism of his work, and government support was reduced in 1902. But by that time most of the experimental work had been completed and published, and he only considered these experiments a means to his goal which was the development of the rural areas in Denmark. It thus happened that in 1902 the windmill in Askov became a prototype electrical power plant serving the village of Askov until 1958 with batteries for energy storage and a petrol-engine for reserve power.

At the same time la Cour started to propagate the idea of wind electricity. If people in a city or a village planned a power plant, la Cour was often invited to explain the advantages of this new energy source. He even wrote a fairy tale, "Trolden" (the troll), about energy for children, and there was no doubt that electricity was the hero in that fairy tale.

The most important means of propagating wind electricity was the Danish Wind Electricity Society (DVES) initiated by la Cour in 1903. For the next five years, the consultant engineer of DVES planned a hundred small electricity power-plants, a third of these being based on wind power.

Just as important for rural electricity was the training of rural electricians. DVES instructed about 20 electricians a year in Askov. They learned theory for three months with the maintenance and development of the Askov wind power plant as a parallel practical experience. They finished with a project building a small power plant somewhere in Denmark. This was a short training period compared to the 4 years of the city electrician, but an investigation of their later careers shows that most of them found jobs as rural electricians – many as managers of small power plants.

Finally DVES published a bimonthly journal on wind electricity with la Cour as the author of most of the articles. Comparing this total activity with the actual number of small rural electric power plants built in Denmark in the beginning of the century one must conclude that DVES was one of the most important factors in the unique decentralized electrification in Denmark.

== Poul la Cour Prize ==
In 1992, in recognition of Poul la Cour's pioneering work in wind energy technology, the European Wind Energy Association, now known as Wind Europe, established the Poul la Cour Prize for outstanding contributions to the wind energy industry.

=== Winners ===
- 1993 Erik Grove Nielsen - Aerostar for pioneering blade design
- 1995 Aloys Wobben - Enercon for the gearless ENERCON turbine
- 1999 Søren Krohn - Danish Wind Industry Association - for www.windpower.org
- 2001 Ecotecnica for their co-operative organisation structure
- 2003 Wolfgang Palz - EC for his work at the European Commission
- 2004 Esteban Morras - EHN for establishing EHN as one of the leading renewable energy developers in the world
- 2006 Andrew Garrad - Garrad Hassan for outstanding personal achievement in wind energy
- 2007 Erik Lundtang Petersen - Risø in honour of outstanding achievements in wind energy and for his scientific integrity
- 2008 Jos Beurskens - Energy Research Centre of the Netherlands (ECN) for his outstanding achievements and many years’ service in the field of wind energy
- 2009 Mechtild Rothe - MEP for her commitment to promoting renewable energy in Europe
- 2010 Ian Mays RES - CEO and founder of one of the foremost contributors to the development of wind energy on the international stage
- 2011 Heinrik Stiesdal - Siemens Chief Technology Officer at Siemens Wind Power.
- 2012 Christian Nath Germanischer Lloyd (GL).German classification society
- 2013 Professor Arthouros Zervos - EWEA President (2001 - 2013)
- 2014 Eddie O'Connor - Mainstream Renewable Power's founder and CEO
- 2019 John T Olesen - GE Renewables, for outstanding contribution to wind energy technology
- 2021 Anne Velenturf - University of Leeds, for her contribution to circular economy for sustainable wind industry development

== Patents ==
- Elektriske Telegrafapparater. Danish Patent no. 41, 1875
- Obtaining synchronous Movements. English Patent no. 4779, 1882.
- Fremgangsmåde til Spektrotelegrafi, samt dertilhørende Apparater. Danish Patent no. 193, 1890.
- Apparat til at bringe en motor til automatisk at følge en af samme uafhængig bevæget Mekanisme. Danish Patent no. 1068, 1892
- Fremgangsmåde og Anordning til Formering og Udvaskning af Kviksølvkatoder under ensartede Betingelser. Danish Patent no. 5048, 1902.
- Automatisk Reguleringsmetode for en elektrisk Strøm fra en Ligestrømsdynamo til et Akkumulatorbatteri med dertil hørende Ledningsnet. Danish patent no. 6138, 1903. English patent no. 131, 1904.
