= Kevin McCurley =

Kevin McCurley may refer to:

- Kevin McCurley (cryptographer), American mathematician, computer scientist and cryptographer
- Kevin McCurley (footballer) (1926–2000), English football forward
