= Bressoud =

Bressoud is a surname. Notable people with the name include:

- David Bressoud (born 1950), American mathematician
- Ed Bressoud (1932–2023), American baseball player
