= Paul T. Bateman =

American mathematician (1919-2012)

- Born: June 6, 1919
- Died: December 26, 2012 (aged 93)
- Education: University of Pennsylvania (PhD, 1946)
- Scientific career
- Workplaces: Yale University; Institute for Advanced Study; University of Illinois at Urbana-Champaign
- Thesis: On the Representation of a Number as a Sum of Three Squares (1946)
- Doctoral advisor: Hans Adolph Rademacher
- Doctoral students: Marvin Knopp; Kevin McCurley; George B. Purdy; Claudia Spiro

Paul Trevier Bateman (June 6, 1919 – December 26, 2012) was an American number theorist, known for formulating the Bateman–Horn conjecture on the density of prime number values generated by systems of polynomials and the New Mersenne conjecture relating the occurrences of Mersenne primes and Wagstaff primes.

Born in Philadelphia, Bateman received his Ph.D. from the University of Pennsylvania in 1946, under the supervision of Hans Rademacher. After temporary positions at Yale University and the Institute for Advanced Study, he joined in 1950 the mathematics department at the University of Illinois at Urbana-Champaign, where he was department chair for 15 years and was subsequently an emeritus professor. He was the doctoral advisor of 20 students, including Marvin Knopp, Kevin McCurley, George B. Purdy, and Claudia Spiro.

Bateman was a member of the American Mathematical Society for 71 years. He served as an associate secretary for 16 years, a member of the board of trustees for 4 years, and a member of the Mathematical Reviews Committee for 5 years.

== Textbooks ==
Bateman was a coauthor of Analytic Number Theory: An Introductory Course. He was also a contributor to the second edition of the textbook Elementary Number Theory, a translation into English of Edmund Landau's German language text Elementare Zahlentheorie.

== Personal information ==
Bateman attended Upper Moreland High School, which recognized his accomplishments by inducting him into its Hall of Fame in 1999. He was department head at the University of Illinois at Urbana-Champaign for 15 years, and had a flair for the dramatic, which led to his being called P. T. Barnum. In the Christmas skit one year the students had a character called Batman, with aluminum foil on his head to simulate baldness. Not to be outdone, at the following year's skit Bateman himself appeared in a Batman costume.

As department head, Bateman was a great believer in the committee of one because it made committee meetings unnecessary. Ph.D. candidates had to pass an oral exam in either German, Russian or French. It happened that Philippe Tondeur was fluent in those three languages, and so Bateman gave him the job of examining all the candidates. Bateman served as Problems editor of The American Mathematical Monthly from 1986 to 1991. His first act was to solve all the problems in the backlog. He visited the Institute for Advanced Study three times.
