= Heinz Prüfer =

German mathematician (1896–1934)

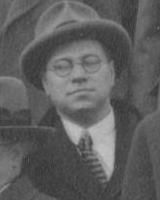
Heinz Prüfer (1930).

Ernst Paul Heinz Prüfer (10 November 1896 – 7 April 1934) was a German mathematician born in Wilhelmshaven. His major contributions were on abelian groups, graph theory, algebraic numbers, knot theory and Sturm–Liouville theory.

In 1915 he began his university studies in mathematics, physics and chemistry in Berlin. After that he started his doctorate degree with Issai Schur as his advisor at Friedrich Wilhelm University, Berlin. In 1921 he obtained his doctorate degree. His thesis was named Unendliche Abelsche Gruppen von Elementen endlicher Ordnung (Infinite abelian groups of elements of finite order). This thesis set the road for his contributions on abelian groups. In 1922 he worked with mathematician Paul Koebe in the University of Jena, and in 1923 he obtained tenure and was at this university until 1927. In that year he moved to Münster University where he worked until the end of his life. His final work was about projective geometry, but it was posthumously completed by his students Gustav Fleddermann and Gottfried Köthe.

Heinz Prüfer was married, but never had children. He died prematurely at 37 years of age in 1934 in Münster, Germany, due to lung cancer.

== Mathematical contributions ==
Heinz Prüfer created the following mathematical notions that were later named after him:

- Prüfer sequence (also known as a Prüfer code; it has broad applications in graph theory and network theory).
- Prüfer domain. Also see Bézout domain, which is a Prüfer domain
- Prüfer rank
- Prüfer manifold also known as Prüfer surface or Prüfer analytical manifold
- Prüfer group
- Prüfer theorems
