= Eberhard's theorem =

Theorem relating the number of edges, vertices and faces of a polyhedron

In mathematics, and more particularly in polyhedral combinatorics, Eberhard's theorem partially characterizes the multisets of polygons that can form the faces of simple convex polyhedra. It states that, for given numbers of triangles, quadrilaterals, pentagons, heptagons, and other polygons other than hexagons, there exists a convex polyhedron with those given numbers of faces of each type (and an unspecified number of hexagonal faces) if and only if those numbers of polygons obey a linear equation derived from Euler's polyhedral formula.

The theorem is named after Victor Eberhard, a blind German mathematician, who published it in 1888 in his habilitation thesis and in expanded form in an 1891 book on polyhedra.

== Definitions and statement ==
For an arbitrary convex polyhedron, one can define numbers $p_3$, $p_4$, $p_5$, etc., where $p_i$ counts the faces of the polyhedron that have exactly $i$ sides. A three-dimensional convex polyhedron is defined to be simple when every vertex of the polyhedron is incident to exactly three edges. In a simple polyhedron, every vertex is incident to three angles of faces, and every edge is incident to two sides of faces. Since the numbers of angles and sides of the faces are given, one can calculate the three numbers $v$ (the total number of vertices), $e$ (the total number of edges), and $f$ (the total number of faces), by summing over all faces and multiplying by an appropriate factor:
$$v = \frac{1}{3}\sum_i i\,p_i, \qquad e = \frac{1}{2}\sum_i i\,p_i, \qquad  f=\sum_i p_i.$$

Plugging these values into Euler's polyhedral formula $v-e+f=2$ and clearing denominators leads to the equation

$$\sum_i (6-i)p_i = 12,$$

which must be satisfied by the face counts of every simple polyhedron. However, this equation is not affected by the value of $p_6$ (as its multiplier $6-i$ is zero), and, for some choices of the other face counts, changing $p_6$ can change whether or not a polyhedron with those face counts exists. That is, obeying this equation on the face counts is a necessary condition for the existence of a polyhedron, but not a sufficient condition, and a complete characterization of which face counts are realizable would need to take into account the value of $p_6$.

Eberhard's theorem implies that the equation above is the only necessary condition that does not depend on $p_6$. It states that, if an assignment of numbers to $p_3,p_4,p_5,p_7,\dots$ (omitting $p_6$) obeys the equation

$$\sum_i (6-i)p_i = 12,$$

then there exists a value of $p_6$ and a simple convex polyhedron with exactly $p_i$ $i$-sided faces for all $i$.

== Examples ==
There are three simple Platonic solids, the tetrahedron, cube, and dodecahedron. The tetrahedron has $p_3=4$, the cube has $p_4=6$, and the dodecahedron has $p_5=12$, with all other values of $p_i$ being zero. These three assignments of numbers to $p_i$ all obey the equation that Eberhard's theorem requires them to obey. The existence of these polyhedra shows that, for these three assignments of numbers to $p_i$, there exists a polyhedron with $p_6=0$. The case of the dodecahedron, with $p_5=12$ and all others except $p_6$ zero, describes more generally the fullerenes. There is no fullerene with $p_6=1$ but these graphs are realizable for any other value of $p_6$; see for instance, the 26-fullerene graph, with $p_6=3$.

A hexagon bisects the cube into two copies of a simple polyhedron with one hexagonal face, three isosceles right triangle faces, and three irregular pentagonal faces. It is not possible to form a simple polyhedron using only three triangles and three pentagons, without the added hexagon.

There is no simple convex polyhedron with three triangle faces, three pentagon faces, and no other faces. That is, it is impossible to have a simple convex polyhedron with $p_3=p_5=3$, and $p_i=0$ for $i\notin\{3,5\}$. However, Eberhard's theorem states that it should be possible to form a simple polyhedron by adding some number of hexagons, and in this case one hexagon suffices: bisecting a cube on a regular hexagon passing through six of its faces produces two copies of a simple roofless polyhedron with three triangle faces, three pentagon faces, and one hexagon face. That is, setting $p_6=1$ suffices in this case to produce a realizable combination of face counts.

== Related results ==
An analogous result to Eberhard's theorem holds for the existence of polyhedra in which all vertices are incident to exactly four edges. In this case the equation derived from Euler's formula is not affected by the number $p_4$ of quadrilaterals, and for every assignment to the numbers of faces of other types that obeys this equation it is possible to choose a number of quadrilaterals that allows a 4-regular polyhedron to be realized.

A strengthened version of Eberhard's theorem states that, under the same conditions as the original theorem, there exists a number $m$ such that all choices of $p_6$ that are greater than equal to $m$ and have the same parity as $m$ are realizable by simple convex polyhedra.

A theorem of David W. Barnette provides a lower bound on the number of hexagons that are needed, whenever the number of faces of order seven or higher is at least three. It states that, in these cases,

$$p_6\ge 2+\frac{p_3}{2}-\frac{p_5}{2}-\sum_{i>6} p_i.$$

For polygons with few pentagons and many high-order faces, this inequality can force the number of hexagons to be arbitrarily large. More strongly, it can be used to find assignments to the numbers of faces for which the required number of hexagons cannot be bounded by any function of the maximum number of sides of a face.

Analogues of Eberhard's theorem have also been studied for other systems of faces and face counts than simple convex polyhedra, for instance for toroidal graphs and for tessellations.

== See also ==
- Erdős–Gallai theorem
- Grinberg's theorem
