= Friedrich Otto Rudolf Sturm =

German mathematician

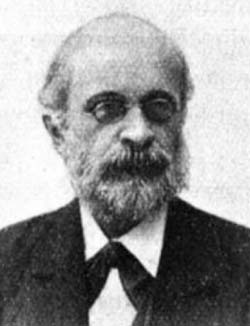
- Born: 6 January 1841; Breslau, Prussia
- Died: 12 April 1919 (aged 78); Breslau, Germany
- Education: University of Breslau
- Scientific career
- Fields: Mathematics
- Workplaces: University of Breslau
- Doctoral advisor: Heinrich Schröter
- Doctoral students: Otto Toeplitz

Friedrich Otto Rudolf Sturm (6 January 1841 – 12 April 1919) was a German mathematician. His Ph.D. advisor was Heinrich Eduard Schroeter, and Otto Toeplitz was one of his Ph.D. students. His best ever proposal type claim is commonly known as "Sturm's Theorem" based on finding the complex imaginary roots of an infinite arbitrary-integer series.

== Works ==
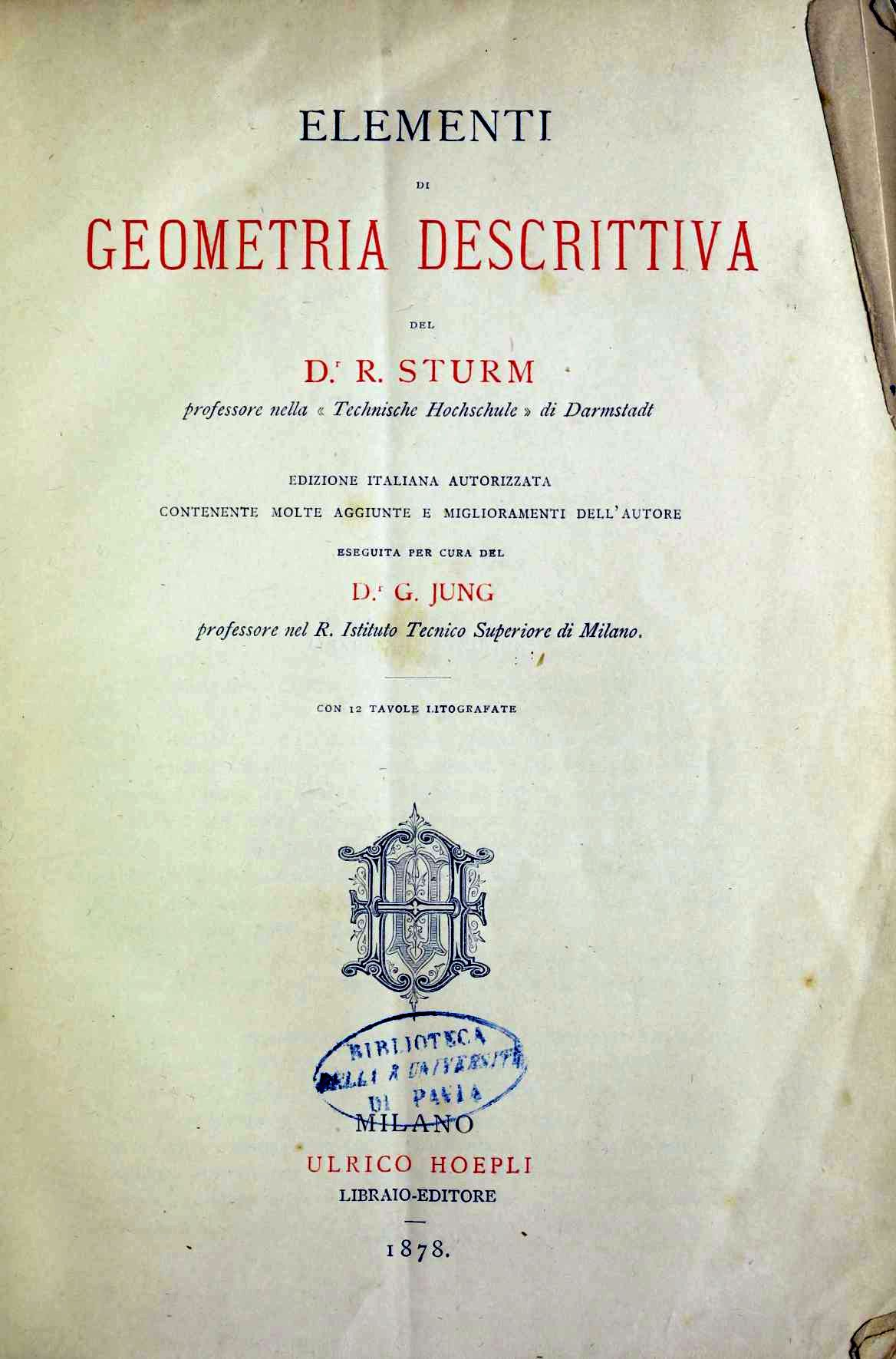
Elementi di geometria descrittiva, 1878

- Elemente der darstellenden Geometrie (in German). Milano: Hoepli. 1878.
