= Grosswald–Schnitzer theorem =

Theorem in analytic number theory

The Grosswald–Schnitzer theorem is a mathematical theorem in the field of analytic number theory that demonstrates the existence of a class of modified zeta functions and Dirichlet L-functions that possess exactly the same non-trivial zeros as the Riemann zeta function, but whose Euler products do not rely on the sequence of prime numbers. The theorem not only provides a construction method but also shows that these modified functions behave very similar to the original functions.

The theorem is particularly interesting because it reveals that the connection between the non-trivial zeros of the Riemann zeta function and the sequence of prime numbers is not as rigid as the Euler product of the Riemann zeta function might suggest. This means one can study the non-trivial zeros of the Riemann zeta function by analyzing these different functions which do not involve prime numbers in their Euler product.

The theorem was proven in 1978 by Emil Grosswald and Franz Josef Schnitzer. Grosswald and Schnitzer published two theorems, where the first concerns only zeta functions and the second addresses the more general Dirichlet L-functions.

== Grosswald–Schnitzer theorem ==
Let $\zeta$ be the Riemann zeta function, and $p_n$ the $n$th prime. A complex number $s \in \mathbb{C}$ is always written in the form $s = \sigma + it$ with real part $\Re(s) = \sigma$.

=== Introduction ===
The Riemann zeta function has in the half-plane $\Re(s) > 0$ a representation as an Euler product over primes:

$$\zeta(s) = \sum_{n=1}^\infty \frac{1}{n^s} = \prod_{n=1}^\infty \frac{1}{1 - p_n^{-s}},$$

where $(p_n)_{n \in \mathbb{N}}$ is the sequence of all prime numbers. The zeros of the Riemann zeta function in the region $\Re(s) > 0$ lie in the so-called critical strip $0 < \Re(s) < 1$ and it can be shown that there are no zeros in the region $\Re(s) \geq 1$. The Grosswald–Schnitzer theorem now states that if one replaces the primes $(p_n)$ with a sequence of real numbers $(q_n)$ satisfying $p_n \leq q_n \leq p_{n+1}$ then the new resulting zeta function has the same zeros for $\Re(s) > 0$ as the Riemann zeta function, although it is not the same function. Hence the structure of the zeros in this region of the Riemann zeta function is not uniquely determined by the primes as it also appears in this much larger class of analytic functions and it shows invariance under this modification.

=== Variant for Zeta Functions ===
Define a sequence of real numbers $q_1, q_2, q_3, \dots$ such that

$$p_n \leq q_n \leq p_{n+1}, \quad \forall n \in \mathbb{N}.$$

Define the modified zeta function:

$$\zeta^*(s) = \prod_{n=1}^{\infty} \frac{1}{1 - q_n^{-s}}, \quad s \in \mathbb{C}.$$

The function $\zeta^*(s)$ absolutely converges for $\Re(s) > 1$ and uniformly converges for $\Re(s) \geq 1 + \varepsilon$ for any $\varepsilon > 0$. Therefore it is holomorphic in $\Re(s) > 1$.

The Grosswald–Schnitzer Theorem then says that the function $\zeta^{*}(s)$ has the following properties:

1. $\zeta^*(s) \neq 0$ for $\Re(s) > 1$,
2. $\zeta^*(s)$ extends to a meromorphic function on $\Re(s) > 0$,
3. It has a simple pole at $s = 1$ with residue $r$ such that $\tfrac{1}{2} \leq r \leq 1$,
4. $\zeta^*(s)$ has exactly the same zeros (with the same multiplicities) as $\zeta(s)$ for $\Re(s) > 0$.

=== Variant for Dirichlet L-Functions ===
Let $\chi(n)$ be a Dirichlet character modulo some natural number $k \in \mathbb{N}$. The associated Dirichlet L-function is defined as:

$$L(s, \chi) = \sum_{n=1}^\infty \frac{\chi(n)}{n^s} = \prod_{n=1}^{\infty} \frac{1}{1 - \chi(p_n)p_n^{-s}}, \quad \Re(s) > 1.$$

Fix a natural number $K > k$ and choose a sequence of integers $q_1, q_2, q_3, \dots$ such that

$$p_n \leq q_n \leq p_n + K$$

and

$$q_n \equiv p_n \mod k.$$

Define the modified L-function:

$$L^*(s, \chi) = \prod_{n=1}^\infty \frac{1}{1 - \chi(q_n) q_n^{-s}}, \quad \Re(s) > 1.$$

The generalized Grosswald–Schnitzer Theorem states that the function $L^*(s, \chi)$ has the following properties:

1. $L^*(s, \chi)$ converges absolutely for $\Re(s) > 1$ and extends meromorphically to $\Re(s) > 0$,
2. $L^*(s, \chi)$ has exactly the same zeros (with the same multiplicities) as $L(s, \chi)$ in $\Re(s) > 0$,
3. If $\chi$ is not a principal character, then $L^*(s, \chi)$ is holomorphic in all of $\Re(s) > 0$.

=== Idea of the proof of the first theorem ===
Define

$$\varphi(s) := \frac{\zeta^*(s)}{\zeta(s)} = \prod_{n=1}^{\infty} \frac{1 - p_n^{-s}}{1 - q_n^{-s}}.$$

One can show that for $\Re(s) > 0$ the function $\varphi(s)$ converges absolutely and is never zero: $\varphi(s) \neq 0$. Therefore

$$\zeta(s) = 0 \iff \varphi(s)\zeta(s) = 0 \iff \zeta^*(s) = 0.$$

To show $\varphi(s) \neq 0$ ones uses a logarithm argument:

$$\log(\varphi(s)) = \sum_{n=1}^\infty \left( \log(1 - p_n^{-s}) - \log(1 - q_n^{-s}) \right) = \sum_{m=1}^{\infty} \sum_{n=1}^{\infty} \frac{1}{m}(q_n^{-ms} - p_n^{-ms}).$$

If this double sum converges absolutely then

$$\varphi(s) = e^{\log(\varphi(s))} \neq 0.$$
