= Heinrich Schröter =

German mathematician

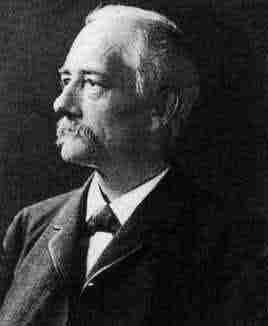
- Born: 8 January 1829; Königsberg, Kingdom of Prussia
- Died: 3 January 1892 (aged 62); Breslau, Prussia, German Empire
- Scientific career
- Fields: Mathematics
- Doctoral advisor: Friedrich Julius Richelot
- Doctoral students: Victor Eberhard; Moritz Pasch; Jakob Rosanes; Rudolf Sturm

Heinrich Eduard Schröter (8 January 1829 – 3 January 1892) was a German mathematician, who studied geometry in the tradition of Jakob Steiner.

== Life and work ==
Schröter went to (along with mathematicians Alfred Clebsch, Rudolf Lipschitz, Carl Gottfried Neumann) the Altstädtisches Gymnasium in Königsberg, studying mathematics and physics. After graduating from the Gymnasium in 1845, he entered the University of Königsberg to continue the study of mathematics and physics under Jacobi school's Frederick Richelot (and Franz Ernst Neumann and Otto Hesse). After his volunteer year in the military, he went to the Berlin Friedrich-Wilhelms-University, where he was taught by Peter Gustav Lejeune Dirichlet and Jakob Steiner. In 1854 he received his doctorate in Richelot in Königsberg with a paper on elliptic functions. He then passed the state exam and was qualified as a teacher in 1855 at the University of Breslau (also on elliptic functions). In 1858 he became associate professor in Breslau and in 1861 professor. He died after he fell ill in 1891.

Schröter was influenced by Steiner's lectures, which were available only as note sheets, on synthetic geometry (projective theory of conics) published in 1867. In Die Theorie der Oberflächen (the theory of surfaces) of 1880, one of his major works, he studied second order surfaces and third order space curves, continuing Steiner's work. For this work, he received the Steiner Prize of the Berlin Academy and became its corresponding member. He also investigated the third-order surfaces and fourth-order space curves.

His students included Victor Eberhard, Moritz Pasch, Jakob Rosanes, and Rudolf Sturm.

== Writings ==
- 1854 Breslau, Philosophische Fakultaet: Inaugural Dissertation: De Aequationibus Modularibus
- 1855 Breslau, Philosophische Fakultaet : Habilitationsschrift: Entwicklung der Potenzen der elliptischen Transcendenten und die Theilung dieser Funktion. Respondent: A. Grimm, Dr phil.; Opponenten: R. Ladrasch, Gymnasiallehrer; E. Tillich, Cand. phil.; H. Jaschke, Stud. phil.
- als Bearbeiter und Herausgeber: Jacob Steiner's Vorlesungen über synthetische Geometrie: Theil 2: Die Theorie der Kegelschnitte, gestützt auf projectivische Eigenschaften. Leipzig 1867, 2. Auflage 1876.
- Die Theorie der Oberflächen zweiter Ordnung und der Raumkurven dritter Ordnung als Erzeugnisse projectivischer Gebilde. Leipzig 1880.
- Die Theorie der ebenen Curven dritter Ordnung, auf synthetische Weise abgeleitet. Leipzig 1888.
- Grundzüge einer rein geometrischen Theorie der Raumcurven vierter Ordnung erster Species. Leipzig 1890.
