= Jakob Rosanes =

German mathematician and chess player

- Born: 16 August 1842; Brody, Austrian Empire
- Died: 6 January 1922 (aged 79); Breslau, Prussia, Germany
- Scientific career
- Fields: Mathematics
- Doctoral advisor: Heinrich Schröter
- Doctoral students: Otto Toeplitz; Ernst Steinitz

Jakob Rosanes (also Jacob; 16 August 1842 – 6 January 1922) was a German mathematician who worked on algebraic geometry and invariant theory. He was also a chess master.

== Life and career ==
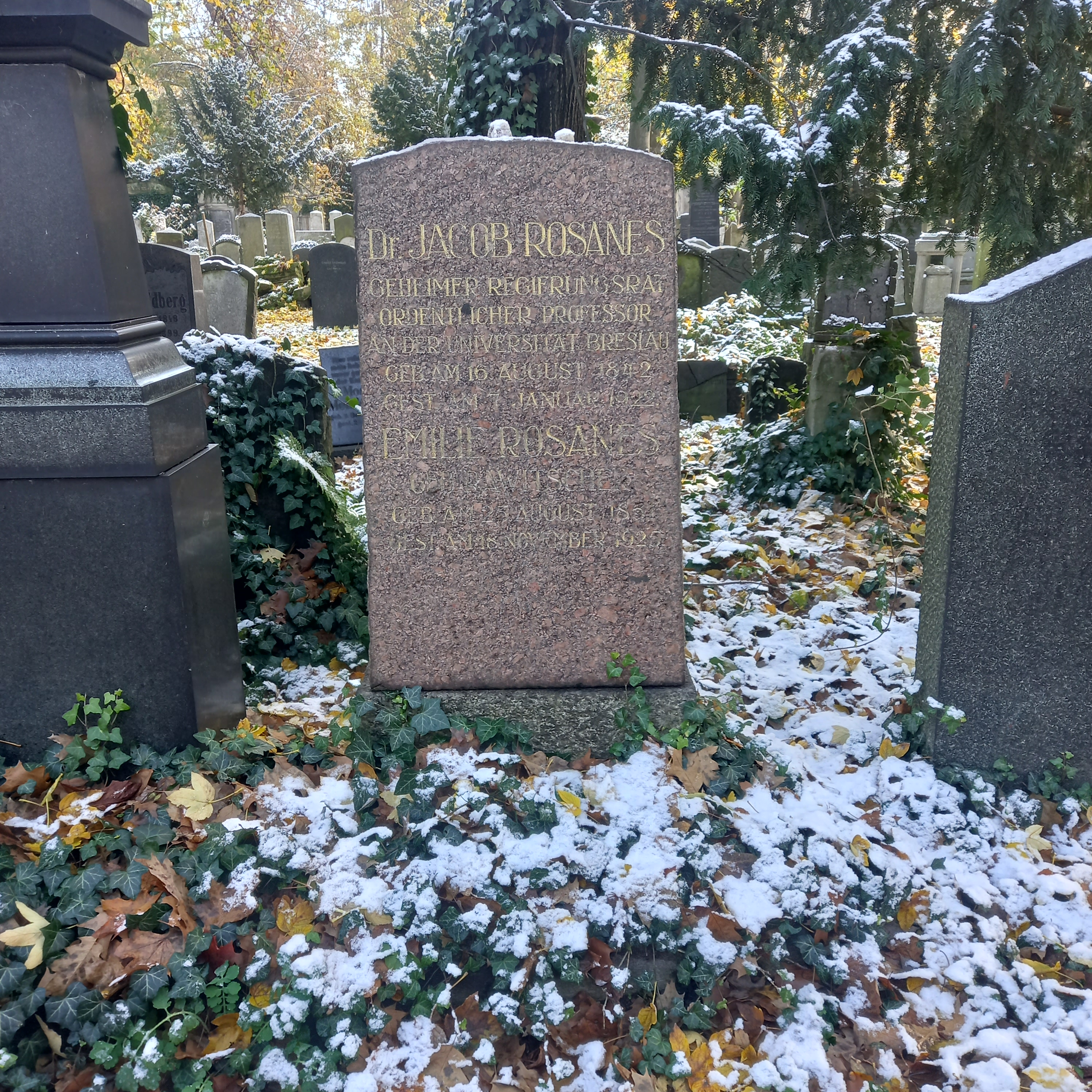
Grave of Jacob Rosanes at the Old Jewish Cemetery in Breslau

Rosanes was a grandson of Rabbi Akiva Eiger, one of the most revered Jewish religious scholars of the Talmud and halachic decisors of the 18th century. Eiger's daughter Baila was Rosanes' mother. Rosanes grew up during a period when the Enlightenment and increasing opportunities for social, academic and economic advancement for culturally assimilated Jews influenced large numbers of Jews to reconsider their faith. He was not religiously observant, and his children converted to Christianity.

Rosanes studied at University of Berlin and the University of Breslau. He obtained his doctorate from Breslau (Wrocław) in 1865 and taught there for the rest of his working life. He became professor in 1876 and rector of the university during the years 1903–1904. In his ‘inspiring’ rectorial speech on 15 October 1903, he described the development of mathematics in the nineteenth century.

Rosanes made significant contributions in Cremona transformations.

== Notable chess games ==
- Jakob Rosanes vs Adolf Anderssen, Breslau 1862, Spanish Game: Berlin Defense. Rio Gambit Accepted (C67), 1-0 Sometimes, Rosanes was able to beat even one of the best masters of his time, Adolf Anderssen...
- Jakob Rosanes vs Adolf Anderssen, Breslau, 1863, King's Gambit: Accepted. Kieseritzky Gambit Anderssen Defense (C39), 0-1 ...but as shows this beautiful game, the opposite result was probably quite usual in their games.
