= Hans Rademacher =

German-born American mathematician

Hans Adolph Rademacher
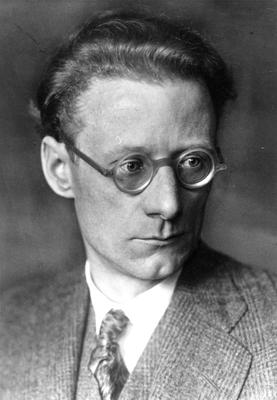
- Born: 3 April 1892; Hamburg-Wandsbek, German Empire
- Died: 7 February 1969 (aged 76); Haverford, Pennsylvania, U.S.
- Education: University of Göttingen
- Scientific career
- Fields: Mathematics
- Workplaces: Humboldt University of Berlin; University of Hamburg; University of Pennsylvania
- Doctoral advisor: Constantin Carathéodory
- Notable students: George Andrews; Paul T. Bateman; Leila Bram; Theodor Estermann; Emil Grosswald

Hans Adolph Rademacher (German: [ˈʁaːdəmaxɐ]; 3 April 1892 – 7 February 1969) was a German-born American mathematician, known for work in mathematical analysis and number theory.

== Biography ==
Rademacher received his Ph.D. in 1916 from Georg-August-Universität Göttingen; Constantin Carathéodory supervised his dissertation. In 1919, he became privatdozent under Constantin Carathéodory at University of Berlin. In 1922, he became an assistant professor at the University of Hamburg, where he supervised budding mathematicians like Theodor Estermann. He was dismissed from his position at the University of Breslau by the Nazis in 1933 due to his public support of the Weimar Republic, and emigrated from Europe in 1934.

After leaving Germany, he moved to Philadelphia and worked at the University of Pennsylvania until his retirement in 1962; he held the Thomas A. Scott Professorship of Mathematics at Pennsylvania from 1956 to 1962. Rademacher had a number of well-known students, including George Andrews, Paul T. Bateman, Theodor Estermann and Emil Grosswald.

== Research ==
Rademacher performed research in analytic number theory, mathematical genetics, the theory of functions of a real variable, and quantum theory. Most notably, he developed the theory of Dedekind sums. In 1937 Rademacher discovered an exact convergent series for the partition function P(n), the number of integer partitions of a number, improving upon Ramanujan's asymptotic non-convergent series and validating Ramanujan's supposition that an exact series representation existed.

== Awards and honors ==
With his retirement from the University of Pennsylvania, a group of mathematicians provided the seed funding for The Hans A. Rademacher Instructorships, and honored him with an honorary degree as Doctor of Science.

Rademacher is the co-author (with Otto Toeplitz) of the popular mathematics book The Enjoyment of Mathematics, published in German in 1930 and still in print.

== Works ==
- with Otto Toeplitz: Von Zahlen und Figuren. 1930. 2nd edn. 1933. Springer 2001, ISBN 3-540-63303-0.
- The Enjoyment of Mathematics. Von Zahlen und Figuren translated into English by Herbert Zuckerman, Princeton University Press, 1957
- with Ernst Steinitz Vorlesungen über die Theorie der Polyeder- unter Einschluss der Elemente der Topologie. Springer 1932, 1976.
- Generalization of the Reciprocity Formula for Dedekind Sums. In: Duke Math. Journal. Vol. 21, 1954, pp. 391–397.
- Lectures on analytic number theory. 1955.
- Lectures on elementary number theory. Blaisdell, New York 1964, Krieger 1977.
- with Grosswald: Dedekind sums. Carus Mathematical Monographs 1972.
- Topics in analytic number theory. ed. Grosswald. Springer Verlag, 1973 (Grundlehren der mathematischen Wissenschaften).
- Collected papers. 2 vols. ed. Grosswald. MIT press, 1974.
- Higher mathematics from an elementary point of view. Birkhäuser 1983.

== See also ==
- Hadamard transform
- Rademacher's contour
- Rademacher complexity
- Rademacher function
- Rademacher–Menchov theorem
- Rademacher's series
- Rademacher system
- Rademacher distribution
- Rademacher's theorem
