= Prüfer theorems =

In mathematics, two Prüfer theorems, named after Heinz Prüfer, describe the structure of certain infinite abelian groups. They have been generalized by L. Ya. Kulikov.

== Statement ==
Let A be an abelian group. If A is finitely generated then by the fundamental theorem of finitely generated abelian groups, A is decomposable into a direct sum of cyclic subgroups, which leads to the classification of finitely generated abelian groups up to isomorphism. The structure of general infinite abelian groups can be considerably more complicated and the conclusion needs not to hold, but Prüfer proved that it remains true for periodic groups in two special cases.

The first Prüfer theorem states that an abelian group of bounded exponent is isomorphic to a direct sum of cyclic groups. The second Prüfer theorem states that a countable abelian p-group whose non-trivial elements have finite p-height is isomorphic to a direct sum of cyclic groups. Examples show that the assumption that the group be countable cannot be removed.

The two Prüfer theorems follow from a general criterion of decomposability of an abelian group into a direct sum of cyclic subgroups due to L. Ya. Kulikov:

An abelian p-group A is isomorphic to a direct sum of cyclic groups if and only if it is a union of a sequence {A_{i}} of subgroups with the property that the heights of all elements of A_{i} are bounded by a constant (possibly depending on i).
