= The Enjoyment of Mathematics =

Book by Hans Rademacher

The Enjoyment of Mathematics: Selections from Mathematics for the Amateur (German: Von Zahlen und Figuren: Proven mathematischen Denkens für Liebhaber der Mathematik) is a mathematics book written by Otto Toeplitz and Hans Rademacher aimed at laypeople and requiring only a high school level background. The focus of the book is on problems from many different fields of mathematics and on proofs by elementary methods. The book covers topics ranging from prime numbers and set theory, maxima and minima to transfinite numbers and many more. The problems in the book require more ingenuity than knowledge to be solved.

The first edition of the German original was first published in 1930, by Julius Springer, Berlin. It was translated into English by Herbert Zuckerman, based on the second edition from 1933. The English translation was published by Princeton University Press in 1957. It contains two additional chapters, added by Zuckerman.

It was translated into Russian as Числа и фигуры, and into Spanish as Números y figuras.
