= Elisabeth Hagemann =

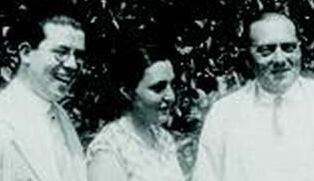
- From left: Köthe, Hagemann, Toeplitz, 1930 in Bonn
- Born: March 6, 1906; Essen
- Died: 1989
- Education: University of Bonn
- Parents: Otto Hagemann (father); Else Hagemann, née Clausius (mother)
- Scientific career
- Thesis: Beitrag zum Reziprokentheorem in linearen Koordinatenräumen (1937)
- Doctoral advisor: Otto Toeplitz, Gottfried Köthe

Elisabeth Hagemann (born 6 Mar 1906 in Essen, died 1989) was among the first female German mathematicians to obtain a Doctor of Philosophy degree.

== Life ==
Her parents were Otto Hagemann, a department director at Friedrich Krupp AG, and Else Hagemann, née Clausius. Elisabeth Hagemann got her abitur from the Victoria school Essen (de) on 6 March 1926. She enlisted at the Ludwig-Maximilians-Universität München in spring 1926, then at the University of Bonn in spring 1928, where she got her Staatsexamen in mathematics, physics, and geography on 4 March 1932.

Then she worked as a school teacher in Bad Godesberg, Bonn, and Rhine Province. In May 1935, she became a research fellow (Wissenschaftlicher Assistent) of Otto Toeplitz at Bonn University. On 28 Apr 1937, she obtained her Ph.D. At that time, her main advisor, Otto Toeplitz, had already been dismissed due to the Nazi Civil Service Law.
