= Hellinger–Toeplitz theorem =

Theorem on boundedness of symmetric operators

In functional analysis, a branch of mathematics, the Hellinger–Toeplitz theorem states that an everywhere-defined symmetric operator on a Hilbert space with inner product $\langle \cdot | \cdot \rangle$ is bounded. By definition, an operator A is symmetric if

$$\langle A x | y \rangle = \langle x | A y\rangle$$

for all x, y in the domain of A. Note that symmetric everywhere-defined operators are necessarily self-adjoint, so this theorem can also be stated as follows: an everywhere-defined self-adjoint operator is bounded. The theorem is named after Ernst David Hellinger and Otto Toeplitz.

This theorem can be viewed as an immediate corollary of the closed graph theorem, as self-adjoint operators are closed. Alternatively, it can be argued using the uniform boundedness principle. One relies on the symmetric assumption, therefore the inner product structure, in proving the theorem. Also crucial is the fact that the given operator A is defined everywhere (and, in turn, the completeness of Hilbert spaces).

The Hellinger–Toeplitz theorem reveals certain technical difficulties in the mathematical formulation of quantum mechanics. Observables in quantum mechanics correspond to self-adjoint operators on some Hilbert space, but some observables (like energy) are unbounded. By Hellinger–Toeplitz, such operators cannot be everywhere defined (but they may be defined on a dense subset). Take for instance the quantum harmonic oscillator. Here the Hilbert space is L^{2}(R), the space of square integrable functions on R, and the energy operator H is defined by (assuming the units are chosen such that ℏ = m = ω = 1)

$$[Hf](x) = - \frac12 \frac{\mathrm{d}^2}{\mathrm{d}x^2} f(x) + \frac12 x^2 f(x).$$

This operator is self-adjoint and unbounded (its eigenvalues are 1/2, 3/2, 5/2, ...), so it cannot be defined on the whole of L^{2}(R). In other words, it will map some functions in L^{2}(R) to functions that are no longer square integrable. One such function could be

$$\psi(x) = \frac{1}{\pi \sqrt{1 + x^2}}.$$
