= George B. Purdy =

American mathematician (1944 - 2017)

George Barry Purdy
- Born: 20 February 1944; San Francisco, California, United States
- Died: 30 December 2017 (aged 73); Cincinnati, Ohio, United States
- Education: University of Illinois
- Known for: Discrete geometry; Number theory; Cryptography
- Scientific career
- Fields: Mathematics and computer science
- Workplaces: University of Cincinnati; Texas A&M University
- Doctoral advisor: Paul T. Bateman; Paul Erdős
- Other academic advisors: Richard Rado

Notes
- He has an Erdős number of one.

George Barry Purdy (20 February 1944 – 30 December 2017) was a mathematician and computer scientist who specialized in cryptography, combinatorial geometry, and number theory. Purdy received his Ph.D. from the University of Illinois Urbana-Champaign in 1972, officially under the supervision of Paul T. Bateman, but his de facto adviser was Paul Erdős. He was on the faculty in the mathematics department at Texas A&M University for 11 years, and was appointed the Geier Professor of computer science at the University of Cincinnati in 1986.

Purdy had Erdős number one and coauthored many papers with Paul Erdős, who regarded him as his own student. He is the "P" in G. W. Peck, a pseudonym for the group of mathematicians that also included Ronald Graham, Douglas West, Paul Erdős, Fan Chung, and Daniel Kleitman.

== Purdy polynomial ==
In 1971, Purdy was asked by Larry Roberts, the director of the DARPA Information Processing Techniques Office, to develop a secure hash function to protect passwords on ARPANET. Purdy developed the so-called Purdy polynomial, which was a polynomial of degree 2^{24} + 17 computed modulo the 64-bit prime p = 2^{64} - 59. The terms of the polynomial could be computed using modular exponentiation. DARPA was satisfied with the hash function, and also allowed Purdy to publish it in Communications of the ACM. It was well received around the world, and DEC eventually used it in their OpenVMS operating system. A DEC report said they chose it because it was very secure and because the existing standard DES could not be exported, which meant that an alternative was needed. OpenVMS uses a 64-bit version, based on a 64-bit prime, the same size as the one in the paper.

== Purdy's conjecture ==
While at Texas A&M, Purdy made an empirical observation about distances between points on two lines. Suppose that n points are to be chosen on line L and another n points on line M. If L and M are perpendicular or parallel, then the points can be chosen so that the number of distinct distances determined is bounded by a constant multiple of n, but otherwise the number is much larger. Erdős was very struck by this conjecture and told it to many others, and it was published in a book of unsolved problems by William Moser in 1981. It came to the attention of György Elekes, who eventually proved the conjecture as the first application of new tools from algebraic geometry that he was developing. After Elekes's untimely death, Micha Sharir collected Elekes's notes and published an organized presentation of these algebraic methods, including work of his own. This, in turn, enabled Katz and Guth to solve the Erdős distinct distances problem, a 1946 problem of Erdős. Work continues on improvements in Purdy's conjecture.

== Awards ==
In 2015, Purdy was awarded the IEEE Joseph Desch Award for Innovation for his work on the Arpa Network and the Purdy Polynomial.

== Selected publications ==
- Erdős, Paul; Purdy, George B. (September 1978). "Some combinatorial problems in the plane". Journal of Combinatorial Theory, Series A. 25 (2): 205–210. doi:10.1016/0097-3165(78)90085-7.
- Purdy, George B. (2006). "A Collision-free Cryptographic Hash Function Based on Factorization". Congressus Numerantium. 180: 161–166.
- Purdy, George B. (December 1988). "Repeated Angles in E_{4}". Discrete and Computational Geometry. 3 (1): 73–75. doi:10.1007/BF02187897. ISSN 0179-5376.
