= Victor Eberhard =

German geometer (1861–1927)

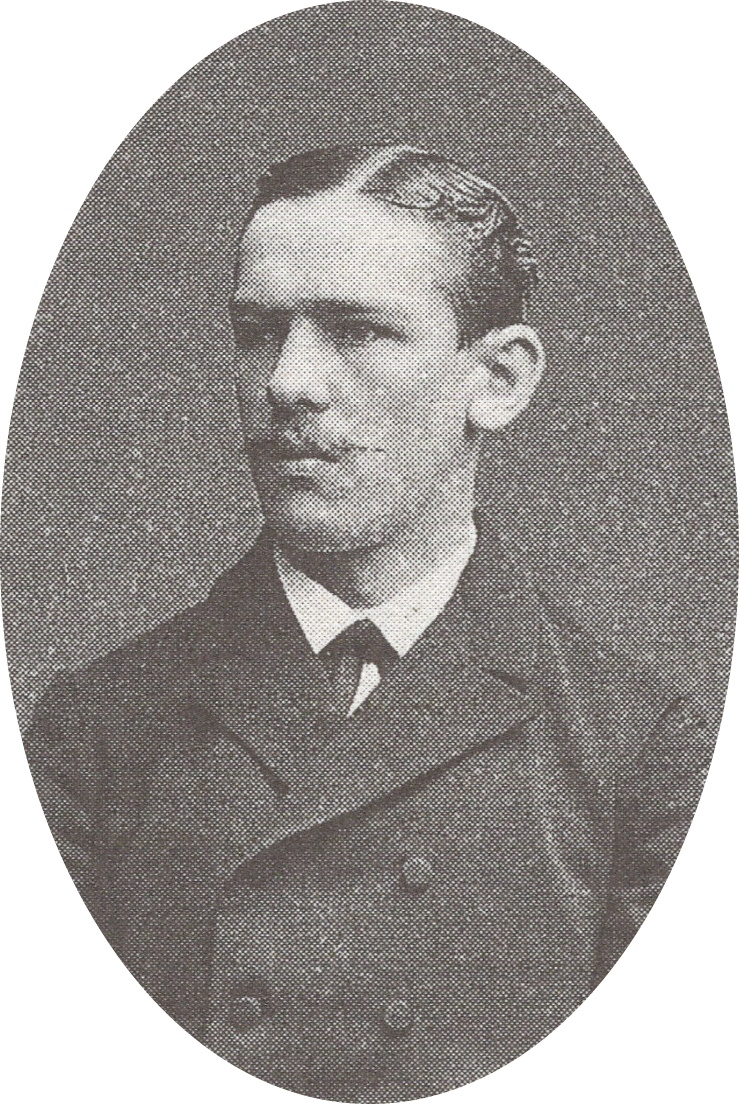
a photo of Victor Guido Feodor Eberhard

Victor Guido Feodor Eberhard (17 January 1861 – 28 April 1927) was a blind German geometer, known for Eberhard's theorem partially characterizing the multisets of faces that can form convex polyhedra.

== Life ==
Eberhard was born on 17 January 1861 in Pless, in the Prussian Province of Silesia (now Pszczyna in southern Poland), where his father Richard Eberhard was a jurist. he became blind in 1873.

He earned a doctorate in 1885 at the University of Breslau, with a dissertation Über eine räumlich involutorische Verwandtschaft 7. Grades und ihre Kernfläche 4. Ordnung concerning 7th-order spatial involutions, supervised by Heinrich Schröter. He continued his studies at the Humboldt University of Berlin and completed his habilitation in 1888 at the University of Königsberg, with a habilitation thesis proving Eberhard's theorem.

He became a professor in 1895 at Martin Luther University of Halle-Wittenberg. The Philosophical Faculty of the university did not support his hire, and he was paid little in his new position. Publishing only small works in geometry after his habilitation, he was forced to retire in 1926. He died in 1927.

== Books ==
Eberhard was the author of two books:

- Zur Morphologie der Polyeder (On the morphology of polyhedra, Teubner, 1891), expanded from his habilitation thesis
- Die Grundgebilde Der Ebenen Geometrie (The foundations of plane geometry, Teubner, 1895)
