= Emil Grosswald =

American mathematician (1912-1989

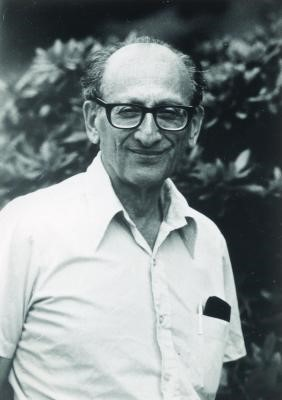
- Born: December 15, 1912; Bucharest, Kingdom of Romania
- Died: April 11, 1989 (aged 76)
- Education: University of Bucharest; University of Pennsylvania
- Scientific career
- Fields: Mathematics
- Workplaces: University of Pennsylvania; Temple University
- Doctoral advisor: Hans Rademacher
- Doctoral students: David Bressoud; Jean-Marie De Koninck

Emil Grosswald (December 15, 1912 – April 11, 1989) was a mathematician who worked primarily in number theory.

== Life and education ==
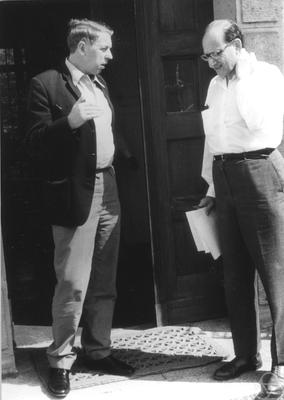
Emil Grosswald (right) and Fred van der Blij in 1968.

Grosswald was born on December 15, 1912, in Bucharest, Romania. He received a master's degree in both mathematics and electrical engineering from the University of Bucharest in 1933, spent six months in Italy and then received a Diplôme from École supérieure d'électricité in Paris.

Grosswald was Jewish. When war broke out, he fled from Paris in June, 1940 to the University of Montpellier, where he began doctoral studies in mathematics. He fled at the end of 1941, through Spain and Lisbon to Cuba. He moved to Puerto Rico in 1946 and then to the United States in 1948. He received his Ph.D. under Hans Rademacher from the University of Pennsylvania in 1950. He was visiting professor at the University of Paris in 1964–1965 and one of his books, The Theory of Numbers, was written that year.

He met his wife Elisabeth (Lissy) Rosenthal in Cuba, probably in 1941 or 1942. They were married in 1950 in Saskatoon, Canada, where he had his first teaching position after receiving his Ph.D. They spent two years at the Institute for Advanced Study in Princeton, New Jersey, in 1951 and 1959. During their first stay, they met Albert Einstein, with whom Emil had a correspondence, later bequeathed to the University of Texas, and formed many friendships, among others with the physicist Freeman Dyson.

Emil and Lissy had two daughters, Blanche, who became a professor of Social Work at Rutgers University but died in 2003 at the age of 50, and Vivian, a professor of law at the University of Pittsburgh. Vivian was decorated in 2007 by the Republic of Austria for her work as the United States appointee to the Austrian General Settlement Fund Committee for Nazi-era property compensation, and in 2013 by the government of France for her services in promotion of the French language and culture in the United States. Emil is the uncle of Pamela Ronald, a member of the National Academy of Sciences, whose father Robert Ronald (né Rosenthal) describes the family's escape from the Nazis in his memoir, "Last Train to Freedom". The son of Lissy's second cousin (Ernest Beutler) is 2011 Nobel Laureate Bruce Beutler. Emil was also the nephew of the French composer Marcel Mihalovici, who arrived in Paris in the 1920s with Georges Enesco.

After Grosswald's death, the American Mathematical Society held a national meeting in his honor, and in 1991 a Festschrift was published in his honor: "A Tribute to Emil Grosswald: Number Theory and Related Analysis." Of his attitude towards mathematics, Marvin Knopp noted the following: "In Grosswald's world, mathematics is challenge demanding dedication and long hours of work; it is science combined with art, truth with beauty. It is passionate and eternal pursuit of excellence. It is humility in the face of a powerful and proud history. Above all, it is meaning, a reason to go on..." Mark Sheingorn wrote: "He seemed to know everything – indeed it seems to me he must always have known everything. He was supportive, enthusiastic, but also demanding ... The depth of his love for mathematics inspired us all to strive to do better."

Grosswald died on April 11, 1989, in Narberth, Pennsylvania.

== Career ==
Grosswald's first three scientific papers, written while he was in Cuba, were published under the pseudonym E. G. Garnea. He published articles in English, German, French, Spanish, and Italian.

After receiving his PhD in 1950, Grosswald taught at the University of Pennsylvania until, towards the end of his life, he moved to Temple University to help build its graduate department in mathematics. He also held positions at the University of Saskatchewan (1950), Institute for Advanced Study (1951 and 1959), the Technion (1980–1981), Swarthmore College (1982), and the University of Paris (Institut Marie Curie).

Grosswald completed some works of his teacher Hans Rademacher, who died in 1969. Rademacher had prepared notes for an Earle Raymond Hedrick Lecture in Boulder, Colorado, in 1963 on Dedekind sums, but fell ill, and Grosswald gave the lecture for him. After Rademacher's death, Grosswald edited and completed the notes and published them in the Carus Mathematical Monographs series as Dedekind Sums. He also edited for publication Rademacher's posthumous textbook Topics in Analytic Number Theory. He published numerous other books and countless articles. Together with Franz Josef Schnitzer he proved the Grosswald–Schnitzer theorem on the existence of classes of modified Zeta functions that share the same non-trivial zeros as the Riemann zeta function.

Grosswald was elected to the Board of Governors of the Mathematical Association of America for 1965–1968. Temple University's Mathematics Department annually sponsors the Emil Grosswald Memorial Lectures.

== Selected publications ==
- Grosswald, Emil; Rademacher, Hans (1972). Dedekind Sums. Carus Mathematical Monographs. Vol. 16. Washington, DC: Mathematical Association of America. ISBN 978-0-88385-016-9.
- Rademacher, Hans (1973). Grosswald, Emil; Lehner, Joseph; Newman, Morris (eds.). Topics in Analytic Number Theory. Grundlehren der mathematischen Wissenschaften. Vol. 169. Berlin: Springer-Verlag. ISBN 978-0-387-05447-6.
- Rademacher, Hans (1974). Grosswald, Emil (ed.). Collected Papers of Hans Rademacher. Vol. 1. Cambridge: MIT Press. ISBN 978-0-262-07055-3.Rademacher, Hans (1974). (View 2nd volume.). Vol. 2. ISBN 0-262-07055-3.
- Grosswald, Emil (1978). Bessel Polynomials. Berlin: Springer-Verlag. ISBN 978-0-387-09104-4.
- Grosswald, Emil (2008) [1984]. Topics from the Theory of Numbers (2nd ed.). Cambridge: Birkhäuser Boston. ISBN 978-0-8176-4837-4.
- Grosswald, Emil (1985). Representations of Integers as Sums of Squares. Berlin: Springer-Verlag. ISBN 978-0-387-96126-2.
