= Height (abelian group) =

In mathematics, the height of an element g of an abelian group A is an invariant that captures its divisibility properties: it is the largest natural number N such that the equation Nx = g has a solution x ∈ A, or the symbol ∞ if there is no such N. The p-height considers only divisibility properties by the powers of a fixed prime number p. The notion of height admits a refinement so that the p-height becomes an ordinal number. Height plays an important role in Prüfer theorems and also in Ulm's theorem, which describes the classification of certain infinite abelian groups in terms of their Ulm factors or Ulm invariants.

== Definition of height ==
Let A be an abelian group and g an element of A. The p-height of g in A, denoted h_{p}(g), is the largest natural number n such that the equation p^{n}x = g has a solution in x ∈ A, or the symbol ∞ if a solution exists for all n. Thus h_{p}(g) = n if and only if g ∈ p^{n}A and g ∉ p^{n+1}A. This allows one to refine the notion of height.

For any ordinal α, there is a subgroup p^{α}A of A which is the image of the multiplication map by p iterated α times, defined using transfinite induction:

- $p^0A = A;$
- $p^{\alpha+1} A = p(p^\alpha A);$
- $p^\beta A = \bigcap_{\alpha<\beta} p^\alpha(A)$ if β is a limit ordinal.

The subgroups p^{α}A form a decreasing filtration of the group A, and their intersection is the subgroup of the p-divisible elements of A, whose elements are assigned height ∞. The modified p-height h_{p}^{∗}(g) = α if g ∈ p^{α}A, but g ∉ p^{α+1}A. The construction of p^{α}A is functorial in A; in particular, sub-quotients of the filtration are isomorphism invariants of A.

== Ulm subgroups ==
Let p be a fixed prime number. The (first) Ulm subgroup of an abelian group A, denoted U(A) or A^{1}, is p^{ω}A = ∩_{n} p^{n}A, where ω is the smallest infinite ordinal. It consists of all elements of A of infinite height. The family {U^{σ}(A)} of Ulm subgroups indexed by ordinals σ is defined by transfinite induction:

- $U^0(A) = A;$
- $U^{\sigma+1}(A) = U(U^\sigma(A));$
- $U^\tau(A) = \bigcap_{\sigma<\tau} U^\sigma(A)$ if τ is a limit ordinal.

Equivalently, U^{σ}(A) = p^{ωσ}A, where ωσ is the product of ordinals ω and σ.

Ulm subgroups form a decreasing filtration of A whose quotients U_{σ}(A) = U^{σ}(A)/U^{σ+1}(A) are called the Ulm factors of A. This filtration stabilizes and the smallest ordinal τ such that U^{τ}(A) = U^{τ+1}(A) is the Ulm length of A. The smallest Ulm subgroup U^{τ}(A), also denoted U^{∞}(A) and p^{∞}A, is the largest p-divisible subgroup of A; if A is a p-group, then U^{∞}(A) is divisible, and as such it is a direct summand of A.

For every Ulm factor U_{σ}(A) the p-heights of its elements are finite and they are unbounded for every Ulm factor except possibly the last one, namely U_{τ−1}(A) when the Ulm length τ is a successor ordinal.

== Ulm's theorem ==
The second Prüfer theorem provides a straightforward extension of the fundamental theorem of finitely generated abelian groups to countable abelian p-groups without elements of infinite height: each such group is isomorphic to a direct sum of cyclic groups whose orders are powers of p. Moreover, the cardinality of the set of summands of order p^{n} is uniquely determined by the group and each sequence of at most countable cardinalities is realized. Helmut Ulm (1933) found an extension of this classification theory to general countable p-groups: their isomorphism class is determined by the isomorphism classes of the Ulm factors and the p-divisible part.

Ulm's theorem. Let A and B be countable abelian p-groups such that for every ordinal σ their Ulm factors are isomorphic, U_{σ}(A) ≅ U_{σ}(B) and the p-divisible parts of A and B are isomorphic, U^{∞}(A) ≅ U^{∞}(B). Then A and B are isomorphic.

There is a complement to this theorem, first stated by Leo Zippin (1935) and proved in Kurosh (1960), which addresses the existence of an abelian p-group with given Ulm factors.

Let τ be an ordinal and {A_{σ}} be a family of countable abelian p-groups indexed by the ordinals σ < τ such that the p-heights of elements of each A_{σ} are finite and, except possibly for the last one, are unbounded. Then there exists a reduced abelian p-group A of Ulm length τ whose Ulm factors are isomorphic to these p-groups, U_{σ}(A) ≅ A_{σ}.

Ulm's original proof was based on an extension of the theory of elementary divisors to infinite matrices.

=== Alternative formulation ===
George Mackey and Irving Kaplansky generalized Ulm's theorem to certain modules over a complete discrete valuation ring. They introduced invariants of abelian groups that lead to a direct statement of the classification of countable periodic abelian groups: given an abelian group A, a prime p, and an ordinal α, the corresponding αth Ulm invariant is the dimension of the quotient

p^{α}A[p]/p^{α+1}A[p],

where B[p] denotes the p-torsion of an abelian group B, i.e. the subgroup of elements of order p, viewed as a vector space over the finite field with p elements.

A countable periodic reduced abelian group is determined uniquely up to isomorphism by its Ulm invariants for all prime numbers p and countable ordinals α.

Their simplified proof of Ulm's theorem served as a model for many further generalizations to other classes of abelian groups and modules.
