= Claudia Spiro =

American mathematician (1956–2023)

Claudia Alison Spiro
- Born: March 4, 1956
- Died: January 4, 2023 (aged 66)
- Other name: Claudia Alison Spiro-Silverman
- Education: Caltech (BS, MS); University of Illinois Urbana-Champaign (PhD 1981)
- Spouse: Robert Silverman
- Children: 3
- Scientific career
- Fields: Mathematics
- Thesis: The Frequency with Which an Integral-Valued, Prime-Independent, Multiplicative or Additive Function of n Divides a Polynomial Function of n (1981)
- Doctoral advisor: Paul Trevier Bateman

Claudia Alison Spiro (March 4, 1956 – January 4, 2023) was an American mathematician who worked primarily in number theory and data science. She is known for her work in number theory and for having an Erdős number of 1.

== Early life ==
Spiro was born on March 4, 1956, to Robert Spiro and Lorraine Shatz. Sprio had a younger brother and younger sister. Her father remarried to in addition to Constance Mobley who gave her a half sister and two half brothers. Spiro grew up in Altadena, California where she enjoyed attending the rose bowl parades. Spiro was taught the musical instaments: the clarinet and the piano. In her childhood she loved mathematics, as early as 5 years old she would do difficult mental arithimetic such as triple digit multiplication problems. She was also a chess player.

== Education ==
Sprio obtained bachelor's degree and master's degree both in mathematics at Caltech. In 1977, she started her work on her PhD at University of Illinois at Urbana-Champaign where she worked with her advisor Paul Trevier Bateman." On October 15, 1981, she obtained her PhD for which she wrote her dissertation "The Frequency with Which an Integral-Valued, Prime-Independent, Multiplicative or Additive Function of n Divides a Polynomial Function of n.

== Career ==
After finishing up the work for her PhD in the summer of 1981, Spiro was accepted the position of George William Hill and Emmy Noether Research Instructor in the mathematics department at SUNY in Buffalo, New York, which started September of that year.

In 2006, Spiro started working at University of Phoenix. She was hired in 2012 as an assistant professor at Southern Polytechnic State University, which was consolidated into Kennesaw State University, to assist with their newly created Teacher Education program.

== Research and contributions ==
Determining whether the number of divisors of some number $n$ and $n+k$ had infinitely many solutions for some k was solved by Spiro. Spiro proved that for the case $d(n)=d(n + 5040)$, there are infinitely many solutions. Roger Heath-Brown and Chris Pinner built upon her work to show this is true for all integer values of $k$.

She is one of the few women to have an Erdős Number of 1, through a research collaboration with Paul Erdős, Andrew Granville, and Carl Pomerance.

== Personal life ==
Spiro married Robert Silverman and had three children: Joel, Sarah, and Isaac. She was also an active member in her church, going on missions and leading Bible studies.

== Death and legacy ==
Spiro died of cancer on January 4, 2023.

== Selected publications ==
- Spiro, Claudia A (October 1992). "Additive uniqueness sets for arithmetic functions". Journal of Number Theory. 42 (2): 232–246. doi:10.1016/0022-314X(92)90022-H.
- Erdös, Paul; Granville, Andrew; Pomerance, Carl; Spiro, Claudia (1990). "On the Normal Behavior of the Iterates Of some Arithmetic Functions". Analytic Number Theory. 85: 165–204. doi:10.1007/978-1-4612-3464-7_13.
