= Anton Marty =

Swiss philosopher and priest (1847–1914)

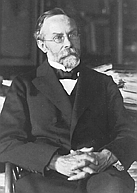
- Born: Martin Anton Maurus Marty; 18 October 1847; Schwyz, Switzerland
- Died: 1 October 1914 (aged 66); Prague, Austria-Hungary

Education
- Education: University of Würzburg; University of Göttingen
- Thesis: Kritik der Theorien über den Sprachursprung (Criticism of Theories About the Origin of Language) (1875)
- Doctoral advisor: Hermann Lotze
- Other advisor: Franz Brentano

Philosophical work
- Era: 20th-century philosophy
- Region: Western philosophy
- School: School of Brentano
- Institutions: Franz-Josephs-Universität Czernowitz (1875–1880); German Charles-Ferdinand University (1880–1913)
- Doctoral students: Alfred Kastil
- Main interests: Philosophy of language, psychology, ontology
- Notable ideas: Descriptive semasiology Inner linguistic form Autosemantica vs. synsemantica Presentational suggestives Impersonals

Ecclesiastical career
- Religion: Christianity
- Church: Catholic Church
- Ordained: 1870
- Laicized: 1872

Martin Anton Maurus Marty (Swiss Standard German: [ˈmarti]; 18 October 1847 – 1 October 1914) was a Swiss-born Austrian philosopher. He specialized in philosophy of language, philosophy of psychology, and ontology.

== Biography ==
Marty was a student and follower of Franz Brentano, his teacher at the University of Würzburg in 1868–70. He was ordained in 1870, but resigned from the priesthood in 1872.

His academic career began at Gottingen where, under Hermann Lotze, he took his degree by submitting an 1875 thesis on the origin of language entitled Kritik der Theorien uber den Sprachursprung. An expanded version of which was also published that same year.

He taught at the Franz-Josephs-Universität Czernowitz from 1875 to 1880. He then taught at the Charles-Ferdinand University in Prague. Both universities fell within the Austrian territories of the Austro-Hungarian empire at that time, as they would for the remainder of Marty's lifetime. The latter university would soon after his appointment split into two separate, though linked, Czech and German institutions. Marty would remain at the German Charles-Ferdinand University, where he would also serve as dean and then rector, until his retirement in 1913.

He died in 1914 at the age of 66.

== Thought ==
Marty was concerned with a synchronic analysis of language itself and has been described as a precursor to linguistic structuralists. Marty distinguished between 'autosemantica' and 'synsemantica', the former can be used by themselves and the latter cannot. Examples of autosemantica include things like nouns and proper names while examples of the latter are things like conjunctions. He used the term 'impersonals' to refer to expressions he considered to be without a subject like "It is raining."

== Legacy ==
The Prague School linguists were influenced by his works.

Franz Kafka also attended his philosophy lectures while at the University of Prague.

== Works ==
- Ueber den Ursprung der Sprache (On the Origin of Language), 1875
- Die Frage nach der geschichtlichen Entwicklung des Farbensinnes, 1879
- Untersuchungen zur Grundlegung der allgemeinen Grammatik und Sprachphilosophie, 1908
- Zur Sprachphilosophie. Die „logische“, „lokalistische“ und andere Kasustheorien, 1910

Nachlass works

Edited by Josef Eisenmeierand, Alfred Kastil, & Oskar Kraus:

- (1916) Raum und Zeit, Halle: Niemeyer.

Gesammelte Schriften

- (1916), Vol. I/1, Mit einem Lebensabriss und einem Bildnis, Halle: Niemeyer.
- (1916), Vol. I/2, Schriften zur genetischen Sprachphilosophie, Halle: Niemeyer.
- (1918) Vol. II/1, Schriften zur deskriptiven Psychologie und Sprachphilosophie, Halle: Niemeyer.
- (1920) Vol. II/2, Schriften zur deskriptiven Psychologie und Sprachphilosophie, Halle: Niemeyer.

== See also ==
- Vilém Mathesius
