= Friedrich Julius Richelot =

German mathematician

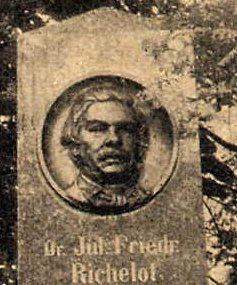
- Portrait on Richelot's tombstone
- Born: 6 November 1808; Königsberg, Kingdom of Prussia
- Died: 31 March 1875 (aged 66); Königsberg, Kingdom of Prussia, German Empire
- Education: University of Königsberg
- Scientific career
- Fields: Mathematics
- Workplaces: University of Königsberg
- Doctoral advisor: Carl Gustav Jacob Jacobi
- Doctoral students: Carl Neumann; Heinrich Schröter

Friedrich Julius Richelot (6 November 1808 – 31 March 1875) was a German mathematician, born in Königsberg. He was a student of Carl Gustav Jacob Jacobi.

He was promoted in 1831 at the Philosophical Faculty of the University of Königsberg with a dissertation on the division of the circle into 257 equal parts (see references) and was a professor there.

Richelot authored numerous publications in German, French and Latin, among them — with his 1832 dissertation — the first known guide to the Euclidean construction of the regular 257-gon with compass and straightedge.

In 1825, he joined the Corps Masovia.

He died in Königsberg in 1875.

== See also ==
- Timeline of abelian varieties

== Thesis ==
- Friedrich Julius Richelot: De resolutione algebraica aequationis x^{257} = 1, sive de divisione circuli per bisectionem anguli septies repetitam in partes 257 inter se aequales commentatio coronata. In: Journal für die reine und angewandte Mathematik. Nr. 9, 1832, S. 1–26, 146–161, 209–230, und 337–358.
