= Otto Toeplitz =

German mathematician (1881–1940)

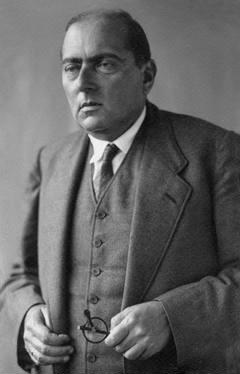
- Otto Toeplitz
- Born: 1 August 1881; Breslau, Silesia
- Died: 15 February 1940 (aged 58); Jerusalem, Mandatory Palestine
- Known for: Hellinger–Toeplitz theorem Silverman–Toeplitz theorem Toeplitz matrix Inscribed square problem
- Scientific career
- Fields: Mathematics
- Doctoral advisor: Jakob Rosanes; Friedrich Otto Rudolf Sturm
- Doctoral students: Elisabeth Hagemann, Hans Schwerdtfeger, Helmut Ulm

Otto Toeplitz (1 August 1881 – 15 February 1940) was a German mathematician best known for his work in functional analysis and the history of mathematics. In addition to his mathematical research, Toeplitz is known for the popular mathematics book The Enjoyment of Mathematics, co-authored with Hans Rademacher.

== Early life and education ==
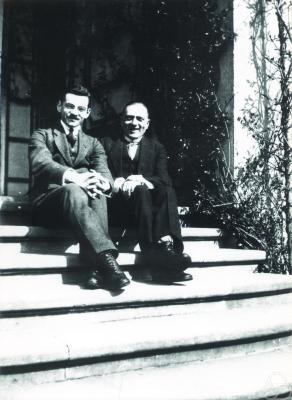
Toeplitz and Alexander Ostrowski.

Toeplitz was born on 1 August 1881 in Breslau, Silesia, to a Jewish family of mathematicians. Both his father and grandfather were gymnasium mathematics teachers and published papers in mathematics. Toeplitz grew up in Breslau and graduated from the gymnasium there.

He next studied mathematics at the University of Breslau and was awarded a doctorate in algebraic geometry in 1905. In 1906 Toeplitz arrived at Göttingen University, which was then the world's leading mathematical center, and he remained there for seven years. The mathematics faculty included David Hilbert, Felix Klein, and Hermann Minkowski. Toeplitz joined a group of young people working with Hilbert: Max Born, Richard Courant and Ernst Hellinger, with whom he collaborated for many years afterward.

At that time Toeplitz began to rework the theory of linear functionals and quadratic forms on n-dimensional spaces for infinite dimensional spaces. He wrote five papers directly related to spectral theory of operators which Hilbert was developing. During this period he also published a paper on summation processes and discovered the basic theory of what are now called the Toeplitz operators.

In 1911, Toeplitz proposed the inscribed square problem:

Does every Jordan curve contain an inscribed square?

This has been established for convex curves and smooth curves, but the question remains open in general (2007).

== Career ==
In 1913 Toeplitz became an extraordinary professor at the University of Kiel. He was promoted to a professor in 1920. Toeplitz and Hellinger wrote an article on integral equations for Felix Klein's Encyclopedia of Mathematical Sciences (1928).

Toeplitz was deeply interested in the history of mathematics. Beginning in the 1920s, Toeplitz advocated a "genetic method" in teaching of mathematics, which he applied in writing the book Entwicklung der Infinitesimalrechnung ("The Calculus: A Genetic Approach"). The book introduces the subject by giving an idealized historical narrative to motivate the concepts, showing how they developed from classical problems of Greek mathematics. It was left unfinished, edited by Gottfried Köthe and posthumously published in German in 1946 (English translation: 1963).

In 1928 Toeplitz succeeded Eduard Study at Bonn University. In 1929, he cofounded the history of mathematics journal "Quellen und Studien zur Geschichte der Mathematik" with Otto Neugebauer and Julius Stenzel. Together with Hans Rademacher, he wrote a classic of popular mathematics Von Zahlen und Figuren, which was first published in 1930 and later translated into English as Enjoyment of Mathematics.

In 1933, the Nazi Civil Service Law came into effect and professors of Jewish origin were removed from teaching in German universities. Initially, Toeplitz was able to retain his position due to an exception for those who had been appointed before 1914, but he was nonetheless dismissed in 1935. In 1939 he emigrated to Mandatory Palestine, where he was scientific advisor to the rector of the Hebrew University of Jerusalem.

== Personal life and death ==
Toeplitz died in Jerusalem from tuberculosis a year after emigrating to Palestine, on 15 February 1940.

His son, Uri Toeplitz (1913–2006), was a co-founder of the Israel Philharmonic Orchestra.

== Quotes ==
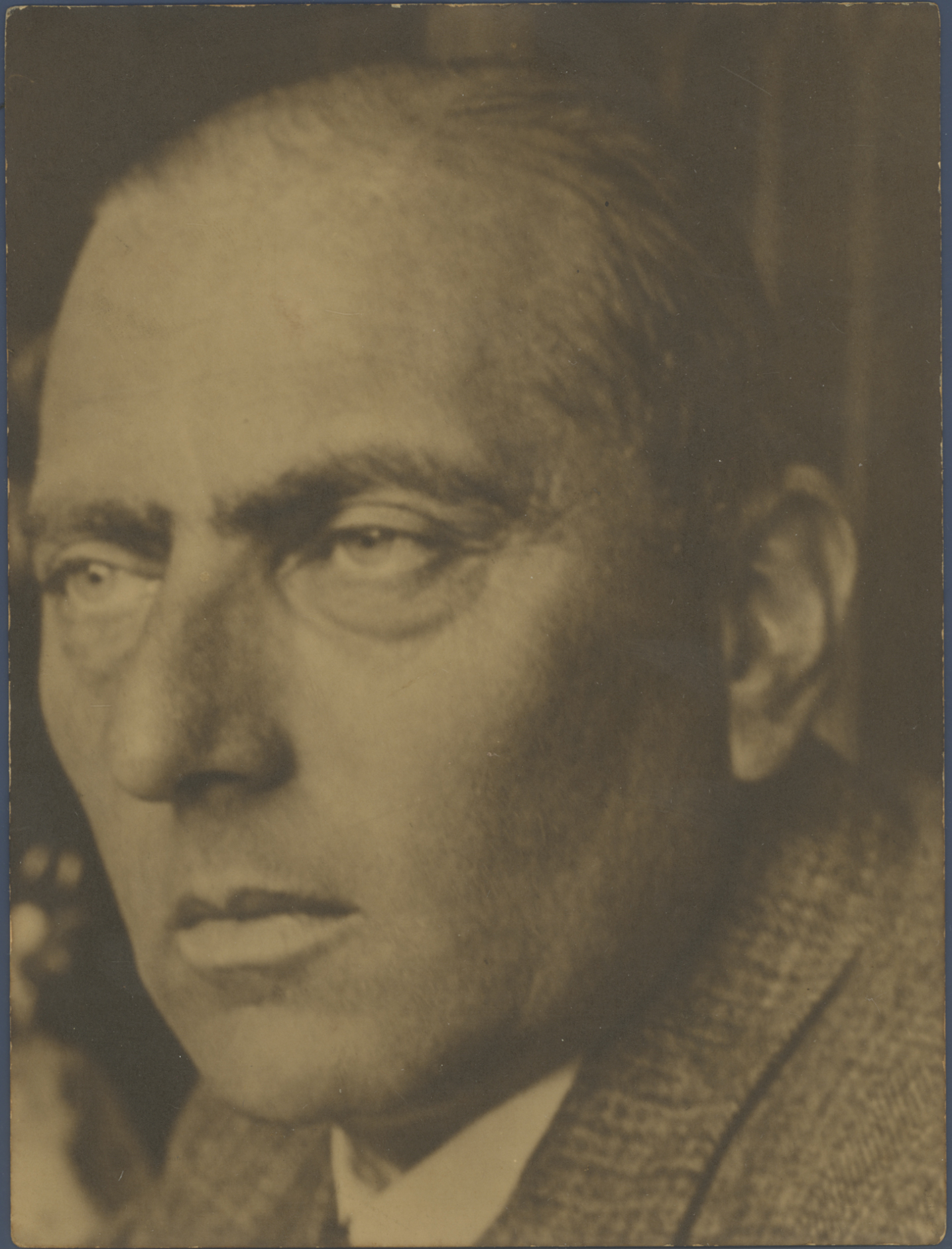
Otto Toeplitz

Here is how Gottfried Köthe, who was Toeplitz's assistant in Bonn, described their collaboration:

Otto liked to take walks and talk about scientific questions. I in fact needed a piece of paper and pencil to write everything down. Toeplitz convinced me that the great outline of research comes to light best in dialog. In his protocols of mutual meetings, sometimes it is marked that the results as drafted were found at a walk along the Rhine river ...As we advanced with our joint work, naturally, new questions arose, and we became more daring, setting ourselves higher goals.

In his own words:

...Mathematics and mathematical thinking are not only part of a special science, but are also closely connected with our general culture and its historic development of mathematical thinking, a bridge to the so called Arts and Sciences and the seemingly so non-historic exact sciences can be found...Our main purpose is to help build such a bridge. Not for the sake of history but for the genesis of problems, facts and proofs, for the sake of the decisive turning points of that genesis...By going back to the roots of these conceptions, back through the dust of times past, the scars of long use would disappear and they would be reborn to us as creatures full of life.

— Toeplitz, 1926

== Publications ==
- Toeplitz, O. (1911). "Zur Theorie der quadratischen und bilinearen Formen von unendlichvielen Veränderlichen". Math. Ann. 70: 351–376. doi:10.1007/BF01564502.
- Otto Toeplitz (1911). "Über allgemeine lineare Mittelbildungen". Prace Matematyczno-Fizyczne. 22 (1): 113–119.
- Hellinger, Ernst; Toeplitz, Otto (1928). "Integralgleichungen und Gleichungen Mit Unendlichvielen Unbekannten". Encyklopädie der Mathematischen Wissenschaften. Wiesbaden: Springer Fachmedien. doi:10.1007/978-3-663-15917-9.
- G. Köthe; O. Toeplitz (1934). "Lineare Räume mit unendlich vielen Koordinaten und Ringe unendlicher Matrizen". Journal für die reine und angewandte Mathematik (171). doi:10.1515/crll.1934.171.193.

=== Books ===
- Rademacher, Hans; Toeplitz, Otto (1957). The Enjoyment of Mathematics: Selections from Mathematics for the Amateur. Translated by Herbert Zuckerman. Princeton University Press.
- Otto Toeplitz, The calculus: a genetic approach, The University of Chicago Press, 2007 ISBN 0-226-80668-5; Toeplitz, Otto (2 July 2018). 2018 pbk edition. University of Chicago Press. ISBN 978-0-226-80669-3. (1st edition, 1963)

== See also ==
- Calderón–Toeplitz operator
- Silverman–Toeplitz theorem
- Hellinger–Toeplitz theorem
- Toeplitz algebra
- Toeplitz matrix
- Inscribed square problem
