= Marvin Knopp =

American mathematician (1933-2011)

Marvin Isadore Knopp
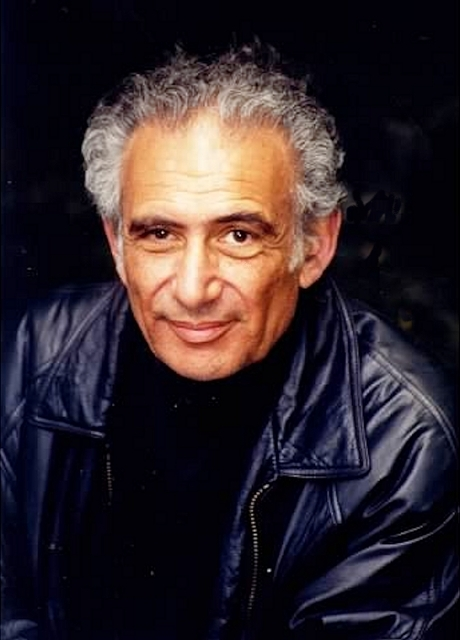
- Born: January 4, 1933; Chicago, Illinois, U.S.
- Died: December 24, 2011 (aged 78); Boca Raton, Florida, U.S.
- Education: University of Illinois
- Scientific career
- Fields: Mathematics
- Workplaces: University of Wisconsin; Temple University
- Doctoral advisor: Paul T. Bateman
- Doctoral students: YoungJu Choie

Marvin Isadore Knopp (January 4, 1933 – December 24, 2011) was an American mathematician who worked primarily in number theory. He made notable contributions to the theory of modular forms.

== Life and education ==
Knopp was born on January 4, 1933, in Chicago, Illinois. He received his PhD under Paul T. Bateman from the University of Illinois in 1958 where he became friends with fellow student Gene Golub. Over the course of his career, he advised twenty Ph.D. students. He is the father of pianist Seth Knopp, and of Yehudah, Abby, and Elana. Marvin was married to Josephine Zadovsky Knopp for 25 years. Knopp died on December 24, 2011, during a vacation in Florida with his partner of 30 years and common law wife Phyllis Zemble. Marvin found happiness from his children, old movies, great music and numbers. During the 6 years following his death, his papers and books were organized (with the help of Wladimer Pribitkin), his photographs and his mathematical correspondence, were donated to the American Institute of Mathematics (AIM). On AIM's website, you can find 131 of Knopp's reprints.

== Personal life ==
Knopp was born in Chicago, Illinois in 1933. He was an Ashkenazi Jew.

== Career ==
After receiving his PhD in 1958, Knopp taught at the University of Wisconsin and then, for a few years, at the University of Illinois Chicago before moving, in 1976, to Temple University where he stayed until his sudden death in 2011. Knopp was a leading expert in the theory of modular forms and a pioneering figure in the theory of Eichler cohomology, modular integrals and generalized modular forms. He was closely associated with Emil Grosswald. In Jean Dieudonné's influential book A Panorama of Pure Mathematics (Academic Press, 1982), he is mentioned (p. 95) as one of those who "made substantial contributions" to the theory of modular forms.

== Selected publications ==
- Knopp, Marvin (1970). Modular Functions in Analytic Number Theory. Rand McNally. ISBN 0-528-60000-1.
- Knopp, Marvin; Berndt, Bruce (2008). Hecke's Theory of Modular Forms and Dirichlet Series. World Scientific Publishing Co. ISBN 978-9812706355.
