= Alfred Kastil =

Austrian philosopher (1874–1950)

- Born: 12 May 1874; Graz, Austria-Hungary
- Died: 20 July 1950 (aged 76); Schönbühel an der Donau, Lower Austria, Republic of Austria

Education
- Education: German Charles-Ferdinand University
- Thesis: Prinzipien der Aristotelischen Ethik (1898)
- Doctoral advisor: Anton Marty

Philosophical work
- School: School of Brentano
- Institutions: University of Innsbruck
- Main interests: Ethics, epistemology, metaphysics
- Notable ideas: Brentanian interpretation of Aristotle's knowledge of the good

Alfred Kastil (German: [ˈka:stiːl]; 12 May 1874 – 20 July 1950) was an Austrian philosopher and Brentano scholar.

== Life and work ==
Alfred Kastil was born in Graz, Austria on 12 May 1874.

He attended secondary school in Brno. The son of a bank clerk, Alois Kastil, in 1892, the year of his leaving school, Kastil came to Prague due to the transfer of his father (both Brno and Prague then being Austrian territories within the Austro-Hungarian empire).

There, he attended the German Charles-Ferdinand University in Prague, where he initially studied law. But he was soon drawn to philosophy. And he studied the same under Anton Marty (1847–1914), a follower, and former student of, Franz Brentano. Kastil was, along with Oskar Kraus and Hugo Bergmann, amongst those of his Prague students that Marty converted to Brentano's philosophy.

Kastil earned his doctorate in 1898 with the thesis Prinzipien der Aristotelischen Ethik (Principles of Aristotelian Ethics) under the supervision of Marty. He habilitated in 1901 with the thesis Zur Lehre von der Willensfreiheit in der nikomachischen Ethik (On the Doctrine of Free Will in Nicomachean Ethics).

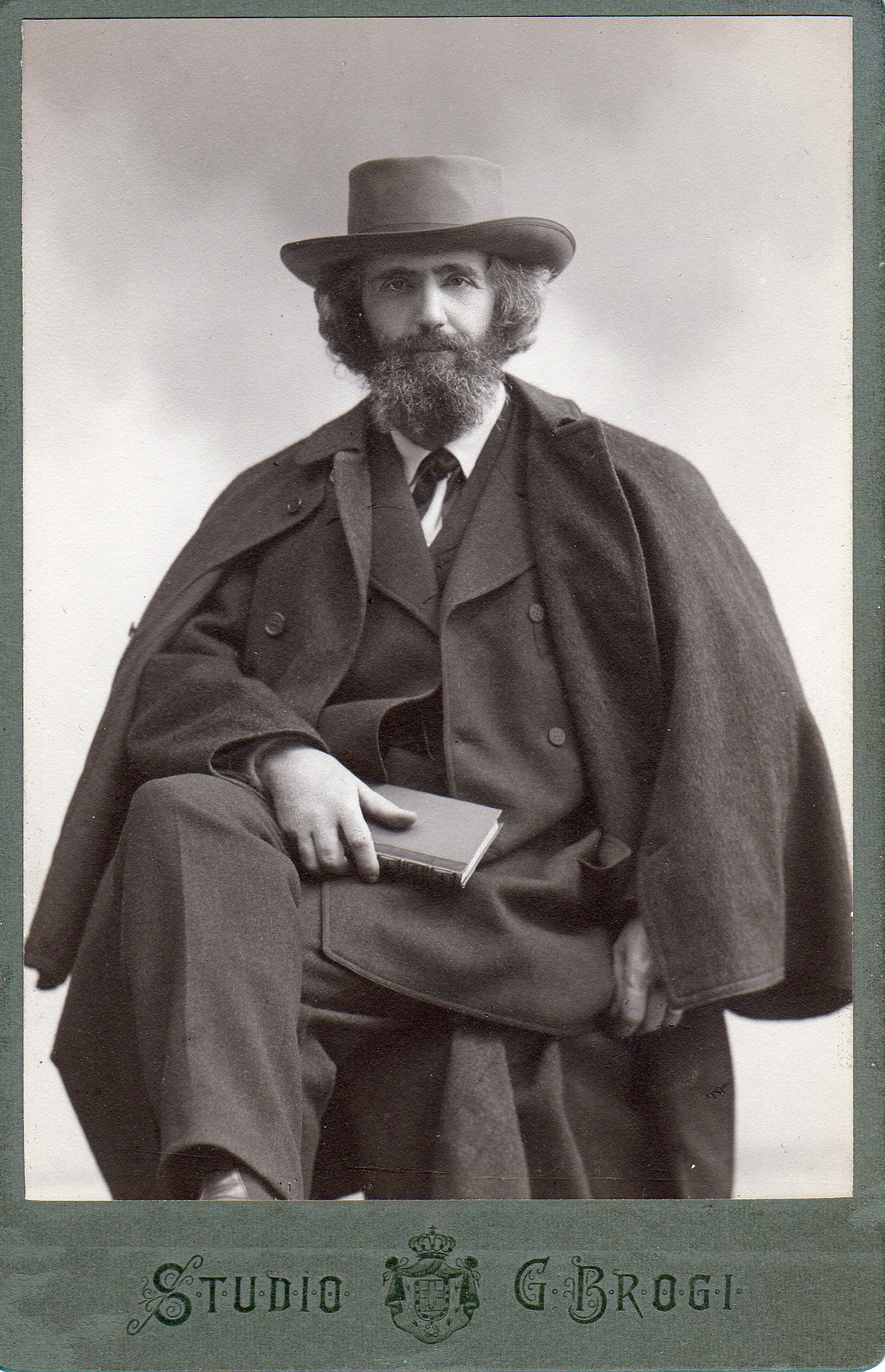
Brentano (1898)

He taught as a professor at the Innsbruck University from 1912.

After Brentano's death in 1917, Kastil, with Oskar Kraus, worked on Brentano's Nachlass, transferring much of it to Innsbruck. With the support of the first President of Czechoslovakia Tomas Masaryk (himself a former student of Brentano) Kastil and Kraus helped to found a Brentano archive in Prague in 1932. The political upheavals of the time however soon brought this project to an end.

Kastil and Kraus succeeded in beginning the editing and posthumous publication of the many drafts, lecture notes and letters left by Brentano. Wolfgang Huemer comments that both "tried to present Brentano's work as best as they could, putting together various texts to what they thought were rounded, convincing works" but that they sometimes did so with a "questionable editorial criteria". And that their work would be "continued by other, more careful editors".

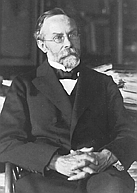
Anton Marty

Reviewing Susan F. Krantz's 1989 English edition, Linda Lopez McAlister (who had edited and helped translate another volume by Brentano) notes that, 'as was his editorial practice', in Vom Dasein Gottes (1929), Kastil "altered the text of some of the earlier lectures so they would conform to Brentano's later views." McAlister regarded this as "an unfortunate scholarly practice because it effaces the traces of the development of Brentano's thought," (Kastil "identifies in the notes which passages have been changed" but "does not give the original text".)

Still, though the editions by Kastil and Kraus "were not done according to the standards of critical editing", as Robin Rollinger and Hynek Janousek note, "they served for a long time to keep Brentano's thought alive."

Rush Rhees studied the work of Brentano with Kastil at Innsbruck (1932–1933) and continued visiting Kastil in Vienna up to 1937.

Engelbert Dollfuss and his clerical fascist Fatherland Front came to power in May 1933, and sources differ on whether it was (late) 1933 or (early) 1934, but at (or near) the end of the winter semester 1933/34, Kastil retired early from Innsbruck for 'political reasons.' As Wilhelm Baumgartner notes, Kastil "opposed the Nazi system and faced serious trouble as a result" whilst others there "were at least close to the Nazi ideology." Peter Gollerm talks of Kastil as being, along with fellow philosopher Theodor Erismann, amongst the very few openly democratically minded opponents of the emerging right-wing authoritarianism and, from around 1929, of Nazism, within the secular Innsbruck faculty of the 1920s onwards. Gollerm (and Urmann) also speak of Kastil giving up his teaching position in protest against the "braune Flut" ('brown tide' i.e. tide of Nazism) at the university. Dietrich von Hildebrand also recalls Kastil reporting that he had left Innsbruck "because the conduct of my colleagues was such that I could only see brown" (this being a reference to the brown-shirts).

Kastil moved to Schönbühel near Melk, where he lived in what had been Brentano's summer house (this being made possible by Brentano's son Giovanni, who Kastil had tutored several years prior). There, his main concern was the editing of further writings by Brentano, though he also lectured at the University of Vienna for two semesters (over 1937–1938), latterly on Brentano's philosophy. (And delivered lectures to the Philosophical Society at the University of Vienna in 1935 and 1936.)

At the age of 76, Kastil died suddenly, without prior illness, on 20 July 1950, in Schönbühel an der Dona (now part of Schönbühel-Aggsbach).

In his last year Kastil undertook the writing of a comprehensive exposition of Brentano's philosophy. Franziska Mayer-Hillebrand, a former student, brought the work to publication the year after his death.

Kastil had also begun the preparation of Brentano's Grundlegung und Aufbau der Ethik, and, under her own editorship, Mayer-Hillebrand completed this work in 1952. Mayer-Hillebrand continued Kastil's work with Brentano's Religion und Philosophie (1954) and Die Lehre vom richtigen Urteil (1956). She also continued, as, Jan Srzednicki noted, with Kastil's aim, justified by their understanding of Brentano's own requests, that "his work should be continued, rather than reverently edited",

== Works ==
=== Authored ===
- (1900) "Die Frage nach der Erkenntnis des Guten bei Aristoteles und Tomas von Aquin" ("The question of the knowledge of the good in Aristotle and Thomas Aquinas"), Sitzungsberichte der Kaiserlichen Akademie der Wissenschafen Vienna: Philosophisch-Historische Classe, 142
- (1901) Zur Lehre von der Willensfreiheit in der Nikomachischen Ethik. Prague: Habilitationschrif
- (1909) Studien zur neueren Erkenntnistheorie. i.Descartes. Halle: Niemeyer.
- (1912) Jakob Friedrich Fries' Lehre von der unmittelbaren Erkenntnis. Eine Nachpru¨fung seiner Reform der theoretischen Philosophie Kants, Göttingen: Vandenhoeck & Ruprecht
- (1934) "Ontologischer und gnoseologischer Wahrheitsbegriff," Zur Philosophie der Gegenwart, 23–34: Prague: Brentano Gesellschaft, reprinted in Actes du huitième Congrè International de Philosophie (1936) pp. 918–929
- (1949) "Ein neuer Rettungsversuch der Evidenz der äußeren Wahrnehmung. Kritische Bemerkungen zu Stumpfs Erkenntnislehre" in: Zeitschrift für Philosophische Forschung, vol. 3, 1948, pp. 198–218)
- (1951) Die Philosophie Franz Brentanos: eine Einführung in seine Lehre. Bern: Lehnen.
- (1958) "Brentano und der Psychologismus", in: Zeitschrift für philosophische Forschung, vol. 12, no. 3, pp. 351–359)

=== Edited ===
==== Works by Franz Brentano ====
- (1922) Die Lehre Jesu und ihre bleibende Bedeutung, Leipzig: Meiner
  - translated as The Teaching of Jesus and its Enduring Significance, by Richard Schaefer, 2021
- (1925) Versuch über die Erkenntnis, (Inquiry Into the Nature of Knowledge) Leipzig: Meiner
  - 2nd edition, 1970, expanded, and with a new introduction, by Franziska Mayer-Hillebrand
- (1929) Vom Dasein Gottes, (On the Existence of God) Leipzig: Meiner
  - translated by Susan Krantz, Dordrecht: Nijhoff, 1987
- (1933) Kategorienlehre, Leipzig: Meiner (with introduction and notes by Kastil)
  - translated as: The Theory of Categories by Roderick Chisholm and Norbert Guterman, The Hague: Nijhoff, 1981. (with Kastil's notes, but without his introduction)

==== Works by Anton Marty ====
(with Josef Eisenmeierand and Oskar Kraus)

- (1916) Raum und Zeit. Halle, Niemeyer

Gesammelte Schriften ('Collected Writings')

- (1916), Vol. I/1, Mit einem Lebensabriss und einem Bildnis, Halle: Niemeyer.
- (1916), Vol. I/2, Schriften zur genetischen Sprachphilosophie, Halle: Niemeyer.
- (1918) Vol. II/1, Schriften zur deskriptiven Psychologie und Sprachphilosophie, Halle: Niemeyer. (preface by Kastil)
- (1920) Vol. II/2, Schriften zur deskriptiven Psychologie und Sprachphilosophie, Halle: Niemeyer.
