= Gottfried Köthe =

Austrian mathematician (1905–1989)

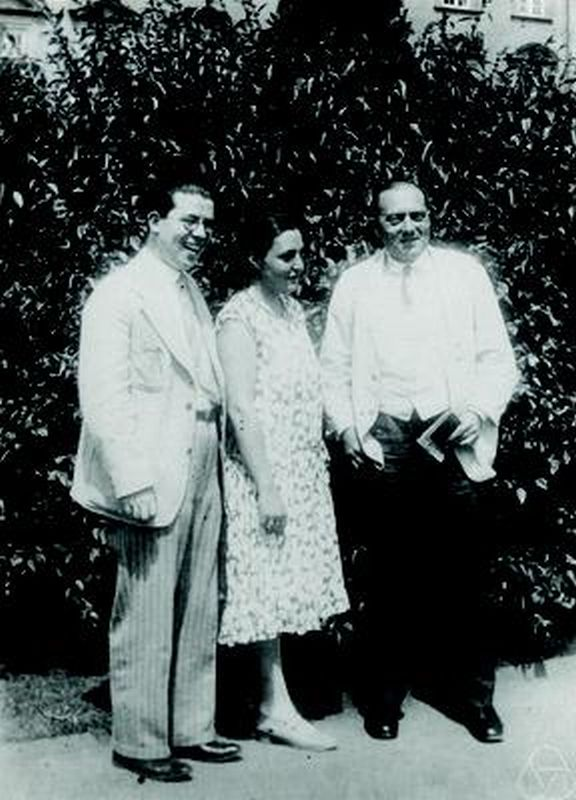
- Gottfried Köthe, Elisabeth Hagemann, Otto Toeplitz, 1930
- Born: 25 December 1905; Graz
- Died: 30 April 1989 (aged 83); Frankfurt
- Known for: Köthe conjecture Nilradical of a ring Serial rings Topological vector space
- Awards: ICM Speaker (1928, 1932, 1936)
- Scientific career
- Thesis: Beiträge zu Finslers Grundlegung der Mengenlehre (1927)
- Doctoral advisors: Anton Rella; Robert von Sterneck
- Doctoral students: Elisabeth Hagemann, Werner Hildenbrand, Tosun Terzioğlu, Joseph Wloka

Gottfried Maria Hugo Köthe (25 December 1905 – 30 April 1989) was an Austrian mathematician working in abstract algebra and functional analysis.

== Scientific career ==
In 1923 Köthe enrolled in the University of Graz. He started studying chemistry, but switched to mathematics a year later after meeting the philosopher Alfred Kastil. In 1927 he submitted his thesis Beiträge zu Finslers Grundlegung der Mengenlehre ("Contributions to Finsler's foundations of set theory") and was awarded a doctorate. After spending a year in Zürich working with Paul Finsler, Köthe received a fellowship to visit the University of Göttingen, where he attended the lectures of Emmy Noether and Bartel van der Waerden on the emerging subject of abstract algebra. He began working in ring theory and in 1930 published the Köthe conjecture stating that a sum of two left nil ideals in an arbitrary ring is a nil ideal. By a recommendation of Emmy Noether, he was appointed an assistant of Otto Toeplitz in Bonn University in 1929–1930. During this time he began transition to functional analysis. He continued scientific collaboration with Toeplitz for several years afterward.

Köthe's Habilitationsschrift, Schiefkörper unendlichen Ranges über dem Zentrum ("Skew fields of infinite rank over the center"), was accepted in 1931. He became Privatdozent at University of Münster under Heinrich Behnke. During World War II he was involved in coding work. In 1946 he was appointed the director of the Mathematics Institute at the University of Mainz and he served as a dean (1948–1950) and a rector of the university (1954–1956). In 1957 he became the founding director of the Institute for Applied Mathematics at the University of Heidelberg and served as a rector of the university (1960–1961).

Köthe's best known work has been in the theory of topological vector spaces. In 1960, volume 1 of his seminal monograph Topologische lineare Räume was published (the second edition was translated into English in 1969). It was not until 1979 that volume 2 appeared, this time written in English. He also made contributions to the theory of lattices.

== Awards and honors ==
- Invited Speaker of the ICM in 1928 in Bologna, in 1932 in Zurich, and in 1936 in Oslo
- Heidelberg Academy of Sciences (1960)
- Gauss medal, Brunswick Academy of Sciences (1963)
- German Academy of Sciences Leopoldina, Halle (1968)
- Honorary degrees from University of Montpellier (1965), University of Münster (1980), University of Mainz (1981) and Saarland University (1981).

== Books ==
- Köthe, Gottfried (1983) [1969]. Topological Vector Spaces I. Grundlehren der mathematischen Wissenschaften. Vol. 159. Translated by Garling, D.J.H. New York: Springer Science & Business Media. ISBN 978-3-642-64988-2. MR 0248498. OCLC 840293704.
- Köthe, Gottfried (1979). Topological Vector Spaces II. Grundlehren der mathematischen Wissenschaften. Vol. 237. New York: Springer Science & Business Media. ISBN 978-0-387-90400-9. OCLC 180577972.
- Köthe, Gottfried (1969). Topological vector spaces. Springer Verlag. ISBN 978-0-387-90400-9. MR 0551623.
