= David Bressoud =

American mathematician

- Born: March 27, 1950 (age 76); Bethlehem, Pennsylvania
- Education: Temple University
- Awards: MAA Distinguished Teaching Award; Beckenbach Book Prize; MAA George Pólya Lecturer
- Scientific career
- Fields: Mathematics
- Workplaces: Pennsylvania State University; Macalester College
- Doctoral advisor: Emil Grosswald

David Marius Bressoud (born March 27, 1950, in Bethlehem, Pennsylvania) is an American mathematician who works in number theory, combinatorics, and special functions. As of 2019 he is DeWitt Wallace Professor of Mathematics at Macalester College, Director of the Conference Board of the Mathematical Sciences and a former President of the Mathematical Association of America.

== Life and education ==
Bressoud was born March 27, 1950, in Bethlehem, Pennsylvania. He became interested in mathematics in the seventh grade, where he had a teacher who encouraged him and gave him challenging problems. He attended Albert Wilansky's National Science Foundation summer program at Lehigh University between his junior and senior years in high school, where he also spent most of his time working on problems.

He graduated from Swarthmore College in 1971. When he started at Swarthmore he had not yet decided on a major, but after his first year he decided to get out of college as quickly as possibly and had no interest in graduate school, and the quickest way out was to major in mathematics.

After graduating Bressoud became a Peace Corps volunteer in Antigua from 1971 to 1973, teaching math and science at Clare Hall School. While in Antigua he realized he missed mathematics, and kept working on it as a hobby. After the Peace Corps he went to graduate school at Temple University, and received his PhD in 1977 under Emil Grosswald.

== Career ==
After receiving his PhD, Bressoud taught at Pennsylvania State University from 1977 to 1994, reaching the rank of full professor in 1986. During this period he held visiting positions at the Institute for Advanced Study (1979–1980), the University of Wisconsin (1980–81 and 1982), the University of Minnesota (1983 and 1998), and the University of Strasbourg (1984–85).

His focus at Penn State was mathematics research, but in the late 1980s he became more interested in teaching and writing textbooks, and he decided to make a move. He said in a 2008 interview, "I needed to be in a place that had a strong focus on teaching and a community of people for whom teaching was what they were most interested in." He decided on a move to Macalester College in 1994, where he was DeWitt Wallace Professor of Mathematics. Since 2005 he has written a monthly online column for MAA titled "Launchings" that focuses on the CUPM (Committee on the Undergraduate Program in Mathematics) Curriculum Guide.

Bressoud received several of the Mathematical Association of America's awards: the Distinguished Teaching Award for the Allegheny Mountain section in 1994, the Beckenbach Book Prize in 1999, and he was a George Pólya Lecturer from 2002 to 2004.

Bressoud was elected president of the Mathematical Association of America in the 2007 elections, and served as President-Elect in 2008 and served as president from 2009 to 2011. In 2012 he became a fellow of the American Mathematical Society. He began phased retirement at Macalester College in 2016 and in 2017 took over the position of Director of the Conference Board of the Mathematical Sciences from Ron Rosier, who had served in that capacity for 29 years.

== Selected publications ==
- Bressoud, David (1989). Factorization and Primality Testing. Berlin: Springer-Verlag. ISBN 978-0-387-97040-0.
- Bressoud, David (1991). Second Year Calculus: From Celestial Mechanics to Special Relativity. Berlin: Springer-Verlag. ISBN 978-0-387-97606-8.
- Bressoud, David (1999). Proofs and Confirmations: The Story of the Alternating Sign Matrix Conjecture. Cambridge: Mathematical Association of America/Cambridge University Press. ISBN 978-0-521-66646-6.
- Bressoud, David; Wagon, Stan (2000). A Course in Computational Number Theory. New York: Key College Publishing in cooperation with Springer. ISBN 978-1-930190-10-8.
- Bressoud, David (2007). A Radical Approach to Real Analysis (2nd ed.). Washington: Mathematical Association of America. ISBN 978-0-88385-747-2.
- Bressoud, David (2008). A Radical Approach to Lebesgue's Theory of Integration. Cambridge: Cambridge University Press/Mathematical Association of America. ISBN 978-0-521-71183-8.
- Bressoud, David (2019). Calculus Reordered: A History of the Big Ideas. Princeton: Princeton University Press. ISBN 978-0-691-18131-8.

== See also ==
- Zeilberger–Bressoud theorem
