= YoungJu Choie =

South Korean mathematician (born 1959)

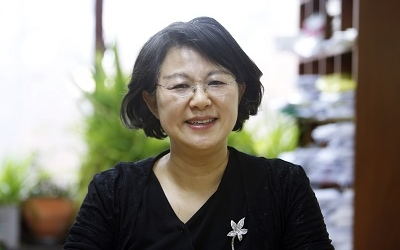
- Education: Temple University; Ewha Womans University
- Scientific career
- Fields: Mathematics
- Workplaces: Pohang University of Science and Technology
- Doctoral advisor: Marvin Knopp

YoungJu Choie (Korean: 최영주, born June 15, 1959) is a South Korean mathematician who works as a professor of mathematics at the Pohang University of Science and Technology (POSTECH). Her research interests include number theory and modular forms.

== Education and career ==
Choie graduated from Ewha Womans University in 1982, and earned a doctorate in 1986 from Temple University under the supervision of Marvin Knopp. After temporary positions at Ohio State University and the University of Maryland, she became an assistant professor at University of Colorado in 1989, and moved to POSTECH as a full professor in 1990. Choie was appointed as the University professor of POSTECH since 2022 till 2029. Choie became a Fellow of the American Mathematical Society in 2013.

== Mathematical work ==
Choie works on various aspects of Jacobi forms. Together with Winfried Kohnen, she has proved upper bounds on the first sign change of Fourier coefficients of cusp forms, generalizing the work of Siegel.

== Selected works ==
- Y. Choie, Y. Park and D. Zagier, Periods of modular forms on $\Gamma_0(N)$ and Products of Jacobi Theta functions, Journal of the European Mathematical Society, Vol. 21, Issue 5, pp 1379–1410 (2019)
- R. Bruggeman, Y. Choie and N. Diamantis, Holomorphic automorphic forms and cohomology, Memoirs of the American Mathematical Society, 253 (2018), no. 1212, vii+167 pp. ISBN 978-1-4704-2855-6
- D. Bump and Y. Choie, “Schubert Eisenstein series”, American Journal of Mathematics Vol 136, No 6, Dec 2014, 1581-1608.
- Y. Choie and W. Kohnen, “The first sign change of Fourier coefficients of cusp forms”, American Journal of Mathematics 131 (2009), no. 2, 517-543.
- Y. Choie and D. Zagier, “Rational period functions for PSL(2, Z)”, Contemporary Mathematics, A tribute to Emil Grosswald: Number Theory and Related Analysis, 143, 89-108, 1993.
- (Book) Y. Choie and MH. Lee, "Jacobi-Like Forms, Pseudodifferential Operators, and Quasimodular Forms”, 318 pages, Springer Monographs in Mathematics on Springer Verlag 2019 (eBook ISBN 978-3-030-29123-5)
- (Book) M. Shi, Y. Choie, A. Sharma and P. Sole, “Codes and Modular forms”, World Scientific, ISBN 978-981-121-291-8 (hardcover) | December 2019 Pages: 232

== Service ==
Choie has been an editor of International Journal of Number Theory since 2004. In 2010–2011 she was editor-in-chief of the Bulletin of the Korean Mathematical Society. She became a president of the society of Korean Women in Mathematical Sciences in 2017. Selective Public Service:

- 2020-2022: NCsoft, Non-executive director
- 2019-2020: The Presidential Advisory Council on Science and Technology, Deliberative Member, Republic of Korea.
- 2019-2020: University Councilor, Representative of Faculty at POSTECH, Pohang, Korea
- 2019-2020: Academic vice president of Korean Mathematical Society, Korea
- 2018-2021: Non-standing member of Board of Trustees, UNIST(Ulsan Institute of Science and Technology), Korea
- 2018-2020: Non-standing member of Board of Trustees, NRF(National Research Foundation), Korea
- 2018–2020, 2009-2013: Director of Pohang Mathematical Institute, POSTECH, Korea
- 2017.12-2019.11: Member, General review committee for academic research supporting the field of education, Ministry of Education
- 2017-2018: Science and Technology Innovation Board, Ministry of Science and Technology Information and communication
- 2018-2019/2020-2021 : Vice President of KOFWST/Auditor, Korea
- 2018-2019: Chief of section committee of group activities of KOFWST, Korea
- 2018: University councilor of POSTECH, Representative of Faculty
- 2017: KWMS (Korea Women in Mathematical Sciences), President, 20170101-20171231
- 2016-2017: KOFWST(Korea Federation of Women’s Sciences and Technology Academics) Member of the board of trustee
- 2016-2018: IMU Committee for Women in Mathematics (CWM) ambassadors
- 2015-2016: CRB(Chief of Research Board), National Research Foundation
- 2009-2015: Organizing Committee, 2014 Seoul ICM, Seoul, Korea
- 2013-2015: Organizing committee, ICWM, 2014, Seoul.
- 2008-2009: ICM-2014 Seoul Bitteing committee.
- 2007-2009: Head of Department of Mathematics, POSTECH, Pohang, Korea.
- 2006: WISE Mentoring Fellow
- 2004-2007, 2012: KWMS(Korean Women in Mathematical Sciences), Board of Trustees:

== Recognition ==
Choie has received several awards such as "The best Journal Paper Award (2002)" from the Korean Mathematical Society, "Kwon, Kyungwhan" Chaired Professor (2004) at Pohang University of Science and Technology, "The best woman Scientist of the year" award (2005) from Ministry of Science and Technology, "Amore-Pacific The best Women in Science and Technology" (2007), KOFWST (Korea Federation of Woman's Science and Technology Association) and the "2014 Distinguished research" award from Ministry of Education of Korea.In 2021, she received the 17th Gyeongam Award in the Natural Sciences category. In 2022, Choie was awarded the Order of Science and Technology Merit (Innovation Medal), conferred by the President of the Republic of Korea. Starting in 2022, She was appointed as a University Professor at POSTECH until 2029. In 2013, Choie became one of the inaugural fellows of the American Mathematical Society. Choie became the first female mathematician as member of the Korean Academy of Science and Technology in 2018., retrieved 2018-12-22. She was the first female mathematician who received (2018) the academic award of Korean Mathematical Society.
