= Oskar Kraus =

Czech philosopher and jurist (1872-1942)

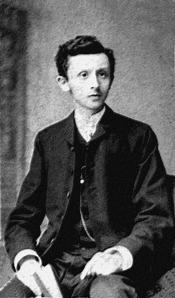
Oskar Kraus

Oskar Kraus (also Oscar Kraus, Austrian German: [kraʊs]; 24 July 1872 – 26 September 1942) was a Czech philosopher and jurist, who belonged to the School of Brentano.

== Life ==
Oskar Kraus, who converted from the Jewish to the Protestant faith, was born in Prague, Austria-Hungary, the son of Hermann Kraus and Clara Reitler-Eidlitz. In 1899 he married Bertha Chitz.

In 1890 he began to study jurisprudence and philosophy under Friedrich Jodl, and Anton Marty, who introduced him to Franz Brentano's philosophy. Kraus made his Doctor of Philosophy in 1895 and attained the habilitation in philosophy in 1902. In 1909 he became Professor extraordinarius and in 1916 Professor ordinarius. After the Germans had occupied Czechoslovakia in 1939, Kraus was put into a concentration camp; he was released, however, and managed to escape to Great Britain. At the University of Edinburgh he gave the Gifford Lectures in 1941. In 1942 he died, aged 70, in Oxford, of cancer.

Family

- Wally Oskarovich Kraus (1930 – 21 October 1981) — son, died in an accident
- Yuriy Voldemarovich Kraus (b. 30 March 1966 in Tallinn)

== Work ==
During World War I, Kraus worked on topics in relation to war and ethics and wrote important works in the field of public international law. Influenced by Brentano, Kraus developed an a priori value theory, which was formulated in opposition to Marxian value theory. He also applied this method to economics. Based on his ideas on law and duty, he developed a juristic hermeneutics in the field of jurisprudence, and criticized historism and positivism. Kraus was also known for his criticism of the theory of relativity, which to him was an accumulation of "absurdities" (like the constancy of the speed of light) and "mathematical fictions".

== Publications ==
- Das Bedürfnis. Ein Beitrag zur beschreibenden Psychologie, Leipzig 1894
- Zur Theorie des Wertes. Eine Bentham-Studie, Halle a. d. Saale: Niemeyer 1901
- Die Lehre von Lob, Lohn, Tadel und Strafe bei Aristoteles, Halle a. d. Saale 1905
- Die aristotelische Werttheorie in ihren Beziehungen zu den modernen Psychologenschule, in: Zeitschrift für die gesamte Staatswissenschaft 61 (1905), 573-92.
- Über eine altüberlieferte Mißdeutung der epideiktischen Redegattung bei Aristoteles, Halle a. d. Saale 1905
- Neue Studien zur Aristotelischen Rhetorik, insbesondere über das genos epideiktikon, Halle a. d. Saale 1907
- Das Recht zu strafen. Eine rechtsphilosophische Untersuchung, Stuttgart 1911
- Platons Hippias Minor. Versuch einer Erklärung, Prag 1913
- Martys Leben und Werke. Eine Skizze, in: Josef Eisenmeier, Alfred Kastil und Oskar Kraus (eds.): Anton Marty, Gesammelte Schriften. Bd. I, 1. Abteilung, Halle a. d. Saale 1916
- Der Krieg, die Friedensfrage und die Philosophen. Ein Vortrag, Prag 1917
- Franz Brentano. Zur Kenntnis seines Lebens und seiner Lehre, München 1919
- Zur Debatte über die Gestaltpsychologie. Einige kritische Darlegungen, Lotos, Prag 69 (1921) 233-42.
- Offene Briefe an Albert Einstein und Max von Laue über die gedanklichen Grundlagen der speziellen und allgemeinen Relativitätstheorie, Wien 1925
- Der Machtgedanke und die Friedensidee in der Philosophie der Engländer Bacon und Bentham, Leipzig 1926
- Albert Schweitzer. Sein Werk und seine Weltanschauung, Berlin 1926/1929
- Bertrand Russells Analyse des Geistes, in: Archiv für die gesamte Psychologie 75 (1930), 289-314, auch in: Wege und Abwege der Philosophie, Vorträge und Abhandlungen von Oskar Kraus, Prag: Calve 1934, 37-61.
- Wege und Abwege der Philosophie. Vorträge und Abhandlungen, Prag 1934
- Die Werttheorien. Geschichte und Kritik, Brünn / Wien / Leipzig: Rohrer 1937
- Albert Schweitzer. His Work and his Philosophy, übers. v. E. G. McCalman, eingeführt v. A. D. Lindsay, London 1944
