= Kevin McCurley (cryptographer) =

American computer scientist and cryptographer

- Education: University of Illinois at Urbana-Champaign
- Years active: 1981–present?
- Known for: Studying number theory and cryptography, working at Google
- Website: https://www.mccurley.org

Kevin Snow McCurley is a mathematician, computer scientist, and cryptographer, and a former research scientist at Google. He has written publications about information retrieval, algorithms, parallel computing, cryptography, and number theory.

== Early life and education ==
When he was a child, McCurley had built model planes and cars, and he enjoyed making things with his hands.

McCurley attended a high school in San Jose, California. There, one of his teachers, Judy Jones, showed him that "mathematics really could be fun and interesting" and encouraged him to attend mathematical contests.

In his first year at Santa Clara University, McCurley had Jerry Anderson, a former president of the MAA, as his professor in calculus; Anderson told "interesting stories" and was able to "relate the mathematics to history and to activities that were meaningful". He started out as a mathematician, but he later retrained himself as a computer scientist.

In 1981, McCurley received his Ph.D. in mathematics from the University of Illinois at Urbana-Champaign. His dissertation in analytic number theory was titled Explicit Estimates for Functions of Primes in Arithmetic Progressions, and his advisor was Paul Trevier Bateman. He also received a master's in statistics there.

In the fall of 1995, McCurley taught an undergraduate course on cryptology at the University of New Mexico.

After he was a post-doc at Michigan State University, McCurley took a job at USC (Los Angeles), where he published some papers with Leonard Adleman about algorithms and complexity.

== Career ==
Before 2005, McCurley worked at IBM Almaden Research Center, Sandia National Laboratories, and at the University of Southern California. McCurley worked in a cryptography group at Sandia National Laboratories, where he worked on applying number theory to cryptography and parallel computing. He then worked at IBM Research in California on digital rights management, where he wrote a few patents; he was there in January 1999.

A former president of the International Association for Cryptologic Research, McCurley was selected as an IACR Fellow in 2005 for his "exemplary service as IACR President and essential leadership in IACR information systems".

From 2005 to at least 2009 McCurley was a research scientist at Google Research. There, he worked on search, advertisements, and Android.

== Miscellany ==
In 2000, McCurley suggested, while speaking at Financial Cryptography '00 conference, that, as a countermeasure against email spam, recipients of email from unknown senders should request that the message include a first name, a few dollars, or a donation to a specific charity as compensation. He also suggested that this be formalized in an open standard.

=== Bets about P vs NP ===
McCurley has made three bets with Ron Fagin about the outcome of the P versus NP problem. In each bet, the outcome P = NP would require Fagin to pay McCurley $50, whereas P != NP would require McCurley to pay Fagin $10. The first bet had a deadline of 31 December 2010, the second a deadline of 31 December 2020, and the third (made in 2021) a deadline of 31 December 2030.
