= FK-AK space =

In functional analysis and related areas of mathematics, an FK-AK space or FK-space with the AK property is an FK-space which contains the space of finite sequences and has a Schauder basis.

== Examples and non-examples ==
- $c_0$ the space of convergent sequences with the supremum norm has the AK property.
- $\ell^p$ ($1 \leq p < \infty$) the absolutely p-summable sequences with the $\|\cdot\|_p$ norm have the AK property.
- $\ell^\infty$ with the supremum norm does not have the AK property.

== Properties ==
An FK-AK space $E$ has the property $E' \simeq E^\beta$ that is the continuous dual of $E$ is linear isomorphic to the beta dual of $E.$

FK-AK spaces are separable spaces.

== See also ==
- BK-space – Sequence space that is Banach
- FK-space – Sequence space that is Fréchet
- Normed space – Vector space on which a distance is defined
- Sequence space – Vector space of infinite sequences
