= Trivial extension =

Trivial extension may refer to the following types of extensions:

- A trivial field extension
- A trivial group extension
- A trivial algebra extension
