= Beta-dual space =

In functional analysis and related areas of mathematics, the beta-dual or β-dual is a certain linear subspace of the algebraic dual of a sequence space.

== Definition ==
Given a sequence space X, the β-dual of X is defined as

$$X^{\beta}:= \left \{ x \in\mathbb{K}^\mathbb{N}\ : \ \sum_{i=1}^{\infty} x_i y_i\text{ converges }\quad \forall y \in X \right \}.$$

Here, $\mathbb{K}\in\{\mathbb{R},\mathbb{C}\}$ so that $\mathbb{K}$ denotes either the real or complex scalar field.

If X is an FK-space then each y in X^{β} defines a continuous linear form on X

$$f_y(x) := \sum_{i=1}^{\infty} x_i y_i \qquad x \in X.$$

== Examples ==
- $c_0^\beta = \ell^1$
- $(\ell^1)^\beta = \ell^\infty$
- $\omega^\beta = \{0\}$

== Properties ==
The beta-dual of an FK-space E is a linear subspace of the continuous dual of E. If E is an FK-AK space then the beta dual is linear isomorphic to the continuous dual.
