= Complemented subspace =

Concept in functional analysis

In the branch of mathematics called functional analysis, a complemented subspace of a topological vector space $X,$ is a vector subspace $M$ for which there exists some other vector subspace $N$ of $X,$ called its (topological) complement in $X$, such that $X$ is the direct sum $M \oplus N$ in the category of topological vector spaces. Formally, topological direct sums strengthen the algebraic direct sum by requiring certain maps be continuous; the result retains many nice properties from the operation of direct sum in finite-dimensional vector spaces.

Every finite-dimensional subspace of a Banach space is complemented, but other subspaces may not. In general, classifying all complemented subspaces is a difficult problem, which has been solved only for some well-known Banach spaces.

The concept of a complemented subspace is analogous to, but distinct from, that of a set complement. The set-theoretic complement of a vector subspace is never a complementary subspace.

== Preliminaries: definitions and notation ==
If $X$ is a vector space and $M$ and $N$ are vector subspaces of $X$ then there is a well-defined addition map
$$\begin{alignat}{4}
S :\;&& M \times N &&\;\to    \;& X \\
&& (m, n)     &&\;\mapsto\;& m + n \\
\end{alignat}$$
The map $S$ is a morphism in the category of vector spaces — that is to say, linear.

=== Algebraic direct sum ===
The vector space $X$ is said to be the algebraic direct sum (or direct sum in the category of vector spaces) $M\oplus N$ when any of the following equivalent conditions are satisfied:

1. The addition map $S : M \times N \to X$ is a vector space isomorphism.
2. The addition map is bijective.
3. $M \cap N = \{0\}$ and $M + N = X$; in this case $N$ is called an algebraic complement or supplement to $M$ in $X$ and the two subspaces are said to be complementary or supplementary.

When these conditions hold, the inverse $S^{-1} : X \to M \times N$ is well-defined and can be written in terms of coordinates as
$$S^{-1} = \left(P_M, P_N\right)\text{.}$$
The first coordinate $P_M : X \to M$ is called the canonical projection of $X$ onto $M$; likewise the second coordinate is the canonical projection onto $N.$

Equivalently, $P_M(x)$ and $P_N(x)$ are the unique vectors in $M$ and $N,$ respectively, that satisfy
$$x = P_M(x) + P_N(x)\text{.}$$
As maps,
$$P_M + P_N = \operatorname{Id}_X, \qquad \ker P_M = N, \qquad \text{ and } \qquad \ker P_N = M$$
where $\operatorname{Id}_X$ denotes the identity map on $X$.

== Motivation ==
Suppose that the vector space $X$ is the algebraic direct sum of $M\oplus N$. In the category of vector spaces, finite products and coproducts coincide: algebraically, $M \oplus N$ and $M \times N$ are indistinguishable. Given a problem involving elements of $X$, one can break the elements down into their components in $M$ and $N$, because the projection maps defined above act as inverses to the natural inclusion of $M$ and $N$ into $X$. Then one can solve the problem in the vector subspaces and recombine to form an element of $X$.

In the category of topological vector spaces, that algebraic decomposition becomes less useful. The definition of a topological vector space requires the addition map $S$ to be continuous; its inverse $S^{-1} : X \to M \times N$ may not be. The categorical definition of a direct sum, however, requires $P_M$ and $P_N$ to be morphisms — that is, continuous linear maps.

The space $X$ is the topological direct sum of $M$ and $N$ if (and only if) any of the following equivalent conditions hold:

1. The addition map $S : M \times N \to X$ is a TVS-isomorphism (that is, a surjective linear homeomorphism).
2. $X$ is the algebraic direct sum of $M$ and $N$ and also any of the following equivalent conditions:
  1. The inverse of the addition map $S^{-1} : X \to M \times N$ is continuous.
  2. Both canonical projections $P_M : X \to M$ and $P_N : X \to N$ are continuous.
  3. At least one of the canonical projections $P_M$ and $P_N$ is continuous.
  4. The canonical quotient map $p : N \to X / M; p(n)=n+M$ is an isomorphism of topological vector spaces (i.e. a linear homeomorphism).
3. $X$ is the direct sum of $M$ and $N$ in the category of topological vector spaces.
4. The map $S$ is bijective and open.
5. When considered as additive topological groups, $X$ is the topological direct sum of the subgroups $M$ and $N.$

The topological direct sum is also written $X = M \oplus N$; whether the sum is in the topological or algebraic sense is usually clarified through context.

== Definition ==
Every topological direct sum is an algebraic direct sum $X = M \oplus N$; the converse is not guaranteed. Even if both $M$ and $N$ are closed in $X$, $S^{-1}$ may still fail to be continuous. $N$ is a (topological) complement or supplement to $M$ if it avoids that pathology — that is, if, topologically, $X = M \oplus N$. (Then $M$ is likewise complementary to $N$.) Condition 2(d) above implies that any topological complement of $M$ is isomorphic, as a topological vector space, to the quotient vector space $X / M$.

$M$ is called complemented if it has a topological complement $N$ (and uncomplemented if not). The choice of $N$ can matter quite strongly: every complemented vector subspace $M$ has algebraic complements that do not complement $M$ topologically.

Because a linear map between two normed (or Banach) spaces is bounded if and only if it is continuous, the definition in the categories of normed (resp. Banach) spaces is the same as in topological vector spaces.

=== Equivalent characterizations ===
The vector subspace $M$ is complemented in $X$ if and only if any of the following holds:

- There exists a continuous linear map $P_M : X \to X$ with image $P_M(X) = M$ such that $P \circ P = P$. That is, $P_M$ is a continuous linear projection onto $M$. (In that case, algebraically $X=M\oplus\ker{P}$, and it is the continuity of $P_M$ that implies that this is a complement.)
- For every TVS $Y,$ the restriction map $R : L(X; Y) \to L(M; Y); R(u)=u|_M$ is surjective.

If in addition $X$ is Banach, then an equivalent condition is

- $M$ is closed in $X$, there exists another closed subspace $N\subseteq X$, and $S$ is an isomorphism from the abstract direct sum $M \oplus N$ to $X$.

== Examples ==
- If $Y$ is a measure space and $X\subseteq Y$ has positive measure, then $L^p(X)$ is complemented in $L^p(Y)$.
- $c_0$, the space of sequences converging to $0$, is complemented in $c$, the space of convergent sequences.
- By Lebesgue decomposition, $L^1([0,1])$ is complemented in $\mathrm{rca}([0,1])\cong C([0,1])^*$.

== Sufficient conditions ==
For any two topological vector spaces $X$ and $Y$, the subspaces $X \times \{0\}$ and $\{0\} \times Y$ are topological complements in $X \times Y$.

Every algebraic complement of $\overline{\{0\}}$, the closure of $0$, is also a topological complement. This is because $\overline{\{0\}}$ has the indiscrete topology, and so the algebraic projection is continuous.

If $X=M\oplus N$ and $A:X\to Y$ is surjective, then $Y=AM\oplus AN$.

=== Finite dimension ===
Suppose $X$ is Hausdorff and locally convex and $Y$ a free topological vector subspace: for some set $I$, we have $Y\cong\mathbb{K}^I$ (as a t.v.s.). Then $Y$ is a closed and complemented vector subspace of $X$. (Note: $Y$ is closed because $\mathbb{K}^I$ is complete and $X$ is Hausdorff. Let $f = \left(f_i\right)_{i \in I} : Y \to \mathbb{K}^I$ be a TVS-isomorphism; each $f_i : Y \to \mathbb{K}$ is a continuous linear functional. By the Hahn–Banach theorem, we may extend each $f_i$ to a continuous linear functional $F_i : X \to \mathbb{K}$ on $X.$ The joint map $F : X \to \mathbb{K}^I$ is a continuous linear surjection whose restriction to $Y$ is $f$. The composition $P = f^{-1} \circ F : X \to Y$ is then a continuous projection onto $Y$. Q.E.D.) In particular, any finite-dimensional subspace of $X$ is complemented.

In arbitrary topological vector spaces, a finite-dimensional vector subspace $Y$ is topologically complemented if and only if for every non-zero $y\in Y$, there exists a continuous linear functional on $X$ that separates $y$ from $0$. For an example in which this fails, see § Fréchet spaces.

=== Finite codimension ===
Not all finite-codimensional vector subspaces of a TVS are closed, but those that are, do have complements.

=== Hilbert spaces ===
In a Hilbert space, the orthogonal complement $M^{\bot}$ of any closed vector subspace $M$ is always a topological complement of $M$. This property characterizes Hilbert spaces within the class of Banach spaces: every infinite dimensional, non-Hilbert Banach space contains a closed uncomplemented subspace, a deep theorem of Joram Lindenstrauss and Lior Tzafriri.

=== Fréchet spaces ===
Let $X$ be a Fréchet space over the field $\mathbb{K}$. Then the following are equivalent:

1. $X$ is not normable (that is, any continuous norm does not generate the topology)
2. $X$ contains a vector subspace TVS-isomorphic to $\mathbb{K}^{\N}.$
3. $X$ contains a complemented vector subspace TVS-isomorphic to $\mathbb{K}^{\N}$.

== Properties; examples of uncomplemented subspaces ==
A complemented (vector) subspace of a Hausdorff space $X$ is necessarily a closed subset of $X$, as is its complement. (Note: In a Hausdorff space, $\{0\}$ is closed. A complemented space is the kernel of the (continuous) projection onto its complement. Thus it is the preimage of $\{0\}$ under a continuous map, and so closed. Q.E.D.)

From the existence of Hamel bases, every infinite-dimensional Banach space contains unclosed linear subspaces. (Note: Any sequence $\{e_j\}_{j=0}^{\infty}\in X^{\omega}$ defines a summation map $T:l^1\to X; T(\{x_j\}_j)=\sum_j{x_je_j}$. But if $\{e_j\}_j$ are (algebraically) linearly independent and $\{x_j\}_j$ has full support, then $T(x)\in\overline{\operatorname{span}{\{e_j\}_j}}\setminus\operatorname{span}{\{e_j\}_j}$. Q.E.D.) Since any complemented subspace is closed, none of those subspaces is complemented.

Likewise, if $X$ is a complete TVS and $X / M$ is not complete, then $M$ has no topological complement in $X.$

== Applications ==
If $A : X \to Y$ is a continuous linear surjection, then the following conditions are equivalent:

1. The kernel of $A$ has a topological complement.
2. There exists a "right inverse": a continuous linear map $B : Y \to X$ such that $AB = \mathrm{Id}_Y$, where $\operatorname{Id}_Y : Y \to Y$ is the identity map.

(Note: This claim is an erroneous exercise given by Trèves. Let $X$ and $Y$ both be $\mathbb{R}$ where $X$ is endowed with the usual topology, but $Y$ is endowed with the trivial topology. The identity map $X \to Y$ is then a continuous, linear bijection but its inverse is not continuous, since $X$ has a finer topology than $Y$. The kernel $\{0\}$ has $X$ as a topological complement, but we have just shown that no continuous right inverse can exist. If $A: X \to Y$ is also open (and thus a TVS homomorphism) then the claimed result holds.)

=== The Method of Decomposition ===
Topological vector spaces admit the following Cantor-Schröder-Bernstein–type theorem:

Let $X$ and $Y$ be TVSs such that $X = X \oplus X$ and $Y = Y \oplus Y.$ Suppose that $Y$ contains a complemented copy of $X$ and $X$ contains a complemented copy of $Y.$ Then $X$ is TVS-isomorphic to $Y.$

The "self-splitting" assumptions that $X = X \oplus X$ and $Y = Y \oplus Y$ cannot be removed: Tim Gowers showed in 1996 that there exist non-isomorphic Banach spaces $X$ and $Y$, each complemented in the other.

== In classical Banach spaces ==
Understanding the complemented subspaces of an arbitrary Banach space $X$ up to isomorphism is a classical problem that has motivated much work in basis theory, particularly the development of absolutely summing operators. The problem remains open for a variety of important Banach spaces, most notably the space $L_1[0,1]$.

For some Banach spaces the question is closed. Most famously, if $1 \leq p \leq \infty$ then the only complemented infinite-dimensional subspaces of $\ell_p$ are isomorphic to $\ell_p,$ and the same goes for $c_0.$ Such spaces are called prime (when their only infinite-dimensional complemented subspaces are isomorphic to the original). These are not the only prime spaces, however.

The spaces $L_p[0,1]$ are not prime whenever $p \in (1, 2) \cup (2, \infty);$ in fact, they admit uncountably many non-isomorphic complemented subspaces.

The spaces $L_2[0,1]$ and $L_{\infty}[0,1]$ are isomorphic to $\ell_2$ and $\ell_{\infty},$ respectively, so they are indeed prime.

The space $L_1[0,1]$ is not prime, because it contains a complemented copy of $\ell_1$. No other complemented subspaces of $L_1[0,1]$ are currently known.

== Indecomposable Banach spaces ==
An infinite-dimensional Banach space is called indecomposable whenever its only complemented subspaces are either finite-dimensional or -codimensional. Because a finite-codimensional subspace of a Banach space $X$ is always isomorphic to $X,$ indecomposable Banach spaces are prime.

The most well-known example of indecomposable spaces are in fact hereditarily indecomposable, which means every infinite-dimensional subspace is also indecomposable.

== See also ==
- Direct sum – Operation in abstract algebra composing objects into "more complicated" objects
- Direct sum of modules – Operation in abstract algebra
- Direct sum of topological groups

== Bibliography ==
- Bachman, George; Narici, Lawrence (2000). Functional Analysis (Second ed.). Mineola, New York: Dover Publications. ISBN 978-0486402512. OCLC 829157984.
- Grothendieck, Alexander (1973). Topological Vector Spaces. Translated by Chaljub, Orlando. New York: Gordon and Breach Science Publishers. ISBN 978-0-677-30020-7. OCLC 886098.
- Jarchow, Hans (1981). Locally convex spaces. Stuttgart: B.G. Teubner. ISBN 978-3-519-02224-4. OCLC 8210342.
- Narici, Lawrence; Beckenstein, Edward (2011). Topological Vector Spaces. Pure and applied mathematics (Second ed.). Boca Raton, FL: CRC Press. ISBN 978-1584888666. OCLC 144216834.
- Rudin, Walter (1991). Functional Analysis. International Series in Pure and Applied Mathematics. Vol. 8 (Second ed.). New York, NY: McGraw-Hill Science/Engineering/Math. ISBN 978-0-07-054236-5. OCLC 21163277.
- Schaefer, Helmut H.; Wolff, Manfred P. (1999). Topological Vector Spaces. GTM. Vol. 8 (Second ed.). New York, NY: Springer New York Imprint Springer. ISBN 978-1-4612-7155-0. OCLC 840278135.
- Trèves, François (2006) [1967]. Topological Vector Spaces, Distributions and Kernels. Mineola, N.Y.: Dover Publications. ISBN 978-0-486-45352-1. OCLC 853623322.
- Wilansky, Albert (2013). Modern Methods in Topological Vector Spaces. Mineola, New York: Dover Publications, Inc. ISBN 978-0-486-49353-4. OCLC 849801114.
