= BK-space =

Sequence space that is Banach

In functional analysis and related areas of mathematics, a BK-space or Banach coordinate space is a sequence space endowed with a suitable norm to turn it into a Banach space. All BK-spaces are normable FK-spaces.

== Examples ==
The space of convergent sequences $c,$ the space of vanishing sequences $c_0,$ and the space of bounded sequences $\ell^\infty$ under the supremum norm $\|\cdot\|_{\infty}.$

The space of absolutely p-summable sequences $\ell^p$ with $p \geq 1$ and the norm $\|\cdot\|_p.$

== See also ==
- FK-AK space
- FK-space – Sequence space that is Fréchet
- Normed space – Vector space on which a distance is defined
- Sequence space – Vector space of infinite sequences
