= Bs space =

Mathematical concept concerning infinite sequences

In the mathematical field of functional analysis, the space bs consists of all infinite sequences (x_{i}) of real numbers $\R$ or complex numbers $\Complex$ such that
$$\sup_n \left|\sum_{i=1}^n x_i\right|$$
is finite. The set of such sequences forms a normed space with the vector space operations defined componentwise, and the norm given by
$$\|x\|_{bs} = \sup_n \left|\sum_{i=1}^n x_i\right|.$$

Furthermore, with respect to metric induced by this norm, bs is complete: it is a Banach space.

The space of all sequences $\left(x_i\right)$ such that the series
$$\sum_{i=1}^\infty x_i$$
is convergent (possibly conditionally) is denoted by cs. This is a closed vector subspace of bs, and so is also a Banach space with the same norm.

The space bs is isometrically isomorphic to the Space of bounded sequences $\ell^{\infty}$ via the mapping
$$T(x_1, x_2, \ldots) = (x_1, x_1+x_2, x_1+x_2+x_3, \ldots).$$

Furthermore, the space of convergent sequences c is the image of cs under $T.$

== See also ==
- List of Banach spaces
