= Chebyshev distance =

Mathematical metric

Position: a8 five, b8 four, c8 three, d8 two, e8 two, f8 two, g8 two, h8 two, a7 five, b7 four, c7 three, d7 two, e7 one, f7 one, g7 one, h7 two, a6 five, b6 four, c6 three, d6 two, e6 one, f6 white king, g6 one, h6 two, a5 five, b5 four, c5 three, d5 two, e5 one, f5 one, g5 one, h5 two, a4 five, b4 four, c4 three, d4 two, e4 two, f4 two, g4 two, h4 two, a3 five, b3 four, c3 three, d3 three, e3 three, f3 three, g3 three, h3 three, a2 five, b2 four, c2 four, d2 four, e2 four, f2 four, g2 four, h2 four, a1 five, b1 five, c1 five, d1 five, e1 five, f1 five, g1 five, h1 five

The discrete Chebyshev distance between two spaces on a chessboard gives the minimum number of moves a king requires to move between them. This is because a king can move diagonally, so that the jumps to cover the smaller distance parallel to a row or column is effectively absorbed into the jumps covering the larger. Above are the Chebyshev distances of each square from the square f6.

In mathematics, Chebyshev distance (or Tchebychev distance), maximum metric, or L_{∞} metric is a metric defined on a real coordinate space where the distance between two points is the greatest of their differences along any coordinate dimension. It is named after Pafnuty Chebyshev.

It is also known as chessboard distance, since in the game of chess the minimum number of moves needed by a king to go from one square on a chessboard to another equals the Chebyshev distance between the centers of the squares, if the squares have side length one, as represented in 2-D spatial coordinates with axes aligned to the edges of the board. For example, the Chebyshev distance between f6 and e2 equals 4.

== Definition ==
The Chebyshev distance between two vectors or points a and b, with standard coordinates $a_i$ and $b_i$, respectively, is

$$D(a,b) = \max_i(|a_i - b_i|).$$
This equals the limit of the L_{p} metrics:
$$D(a,b)=\lim_{p \to \infty} \bigg( \sum_{i=1}^n \left| a_i - b_i \right|^p \bigg)^{1/p},$$
hence it is also known as the L_{∞} metric.

Mathematically, the Chebyshev distance is a metric induced by the supremum norm or uniform norm. It is an example of an injective metric.

In two dimensions, i.e. plane geometry, if the points a and b have Cartesian coordinates $(x_1,y_1)$ and $(x_2,y_2)$, their Chebyshev distance is

$$D_{\rm Chebyshev} = \max \left ( \left | x_2 - x_1 \right | , \left | y_2 - y_1 \right | \right ) .$$

Under this metric, a circle of radius r, which is the set of points with Chebyshev distance r from a center point, is a square whose sides have the length 2r and are parallel to the coordinate axes.

On a chessboard, where one is using a discrete Chebyshev distance, rather than a continuous one, the circle of radius r is a square of side lengths 2r, measuring from the centers of squares, and thus each side contains 2r+1 squares; for example, the circle of radius 1 on a chess board is a 3×3 square.

== Properties ==
Comparison of Chebyshev, Euclidean and Manhattan ('taxicab') distances for the hypotenuse of a 3-4-5 triangle on a chessboard

In one dimension, all L_{p} metrics are equal – they are just the absolute value of the difference.

The two-dimensional Manhattan distance has "circles" i.e. level sets in the form of squares, with sides of length √2r, oriented at an angle of π/4 (45°) to the coordinate axes, so the planar Chebyshev distance can be viewed as equivalent by rotation and scaling to (i.e. a linear transformation of) the planar Manhattan distance.

However, this geometric equivalence between L_{1} and L_{∞} metrics does not generalize to higher dimensions. A sphere formed using the Chebyshev distance as a metric is a cube with each face perpendicular to one of the coordinate axes, but a sphere formed using Manhattan distance is an octahedron: these are dual polyhedra, but among cubes, only the square (and 1-dimensional line segment) are self-dual polytopes. Nevertheless, it is true that in all finite-dimensional spaces the L_{1} and L_{∞} metrics are mathematically dual to each other.

On a grid (such as a chessboard), the points at a Chebyshev distance of 1 of a point are the Moore neighborhood of that point.

The Chebyshev distance is the limiting case of the order-$p$ Minkowski distance, when $p$ reaches infinity.

== Applications ==
The Chebyshev distance is sometimes used in warehouse logistics, as it effectively measures the time an overhead crane takes to move an object (as the crane can move on the x and y axes at the same time but at the same speed along each axis).

It is also widely used in electronic computer-aided manufacturing (CAM) applications, in particular, in optimization algorithms for these.

== Generalizations ==
For the sequence space of infinite-length sequences of real or complex numbers, the Chebyshev distance generalizes to the $\ell^\infty$-norm; this norm is sometimes called the Chebyshev norm. For the space of (real or complex-valued) functions, the Chebyshev distance generalizes to the uniform norm.

== See also ==
- King's graph
- Taxicab geometry
