= Winifred Sargent =

English mathematician

- Born: 8 May 1905; Ambergate, England
- Died: October 1979; London, England
- Education: Newnham College, Cambridge
- Scientific career
- Fields: Mathematics, Numerical integration, Functional analysis

Winifred Lydia Caunden Sargent (8 May 1905 – October 1979) was an English mathematician. She studied at Newnham College, Cambridge and carried out research into Lebesgue integration, fractional integration and differentiation and the properties of BK-spaces.

== Early life ==
Sargent was born into a Quaker family, daughter of Henry Sargent and Edith, his second wife, growing up in Fritchley, Derbyshire. She attended Ackworth School, a private school for Quakers, from 1915 to 1919. She then won a scholarship to attend The Mount School, York, another Quaker school, and later the Herbert Strutt School in Belper. In 1923, while there, she won a Derby scholarship, a State Scholarship, and a Mary Ewart scholarship to attend Newnham College, Cambridge and study mathematics in 1924.

While at Newnham she won further awards: an Arthur Hugh Clough Scholarship in 1927, a Mary Ewart Travelling Scholarship and a Goldsmiths Company Senior Studentship both in 1928. She graduated with a First class degree and remained at Cambridge conducting research but was unsatisfied by her progress and left to teach mathematics at Bolton High School.

== Academic career ==
Sargent's first publication was in 1929, On Young's criteria for the convergence of Fourier series and their conjugates, published in the Mathematical Proceedings of the Cambridge Philosophical Society. In 1931 she was appointed an Assistant Lecturer at Westfield College and became a member of the London Mathematical Society in January 1932. in 1936 she moved to Royal Holloway, University of London, at the time both women's colleges. In 1939 she became a doctoral student of Lancelot Bosanquet, but World War II broke out, preventing his formal supervision from continuing. In 1941 Sargent was promoted to lecturer at Royal Holloway, moving to Bedford College in 1948. She served on the Mathematical Association teaching committee from 1950 to 1954. In 1954 she was awarded the degree of Sc.D. (Doctor of Science) by Cambridge and was given the title of Reader. While at the University of London she supervised Alan J. White in 1959.

Bosanquet started a weekly seminar in mathematics in 1947, which Sargent attended without absence for twenty years until her retirement in 1967. She rarely presented at it, and did not attend mathematical conferences, despite being a compelling speaker.

== Mathematical results ==
Much of Sargent's mathematical research involved studying types of integral, building on work done on Lebesgue integration and the Riemann integral. She produced results relating to the Perron and Denjoy integrals and Cesàro summation. Her final three papers consider BK-spaces or Banach coordinate spaces, proving a number of interesting results.

For example, her 1936 paper proves a version of Rolle's theorem for Denjoy–Perron integrable functions using different techniques from the standard proofs:

as in much of Dr. Sargent's work, the arguments are pushed as far as they will go and counter examples given to show that the results are the best possible.

Her 1953 paper established several important results on summability kernels and is referenced in two textbooks on functional analysis. Her papers in 1950 and 1957 contributed to fractional integration and differentiation theory.

In her obituary, her work is described as being:

marked by its exceptional lucidity, its exactness of expression and by the decisiveness of her results. She made important contributions to a field in which the complexity of the structure can only be revealed by subtle arguments.

== Papers ==
- Sargent, Miss W. L. C. (1929). "On Young's criteria for the convergence of Fourier series and their conjugates". Mathematical Proceedings of the Cambridge Philosophical Society. 25 (1): 26–30. Bibcode:1929PCPS...25...26S. doi:10.1017/S030500410001851X.
- Sargent, W. L. C. (1935). "The Borel derivates of a function". Proceedings of the London Mathematical Society. Second Series. 38 (1): 180–196. doi:10.1112/plms/s2-38.1.180.
- Sargent, W. L. C. (1936). "On the Cesàro derivates of a function". Proceedings of the London Mathematical Society. Second Series. 40 (1): 235–254. doi:10.1112/plms/s2-40.1.235.
- Sargent, W. L. C. (1942a). "A descriptive definition of Cesàro–Perron integrals". Proceedings of the London Mathematical Society. Second Series. 47 (1): 212–247. doi:10.1112/plms/s2-47.1.212.
- Sargent, W. L. C. (1942b). "On sufficient conditions for a function integrable in the Cesàro–Perron sense to be monotonic". The Quarterly Journal of Mathematics. Oxford Series. 12 (1): 148–153. doi:10.1093/qmath/os-12.1.148.
- Sargent, W. L. C. (1946a). "On the order of magnitude of the Fourier coefficients of a function integrable in the C_{λ}L sense". Journal of the London Mathematical Society. First Series. 21 (3): 198–203. doi:10.1112/jlms/s1-21.3.198.
- Sargent, W. L. C. (1946b). "A mean value theorem involving Cesàro means". Proceedings of the London Mathematical Society. Second Series. 49 (1): 227–240. doi:10.1112/plms/s2-49.3.227.
- Sargent, W. L. C. (1948a). "On the integrability of a product". Journal of the London Mathematical Society. First Series. 23 (1): 28–34. doi:10.1112/jlms/s1-23.1.28. hdl:10338.dmlcz/127918.
- Sargent, W. L. C. (1948b). "On the summability (C) of allied series and the existence of $\textstyle (CP)\int\limits_0^\pi \frac{f(x+t)-f(x-t)}{t} \, dt$". Proceedings of the London Mathematical Society. Second Series. 50 (1): 330–348. doi:10.1112/plms/s2-50.5.330.
- Sargent, W. L. C. (1949). "On fractional integrals of a function integrable in the Cesàro-Perron sense". Proceedings of the London Mathematical Society. Second Series. 51 (1): 46–80. doi:10.1112/plms/s2-51.1.46.
- Sargent, W. L. C. (1950a). "On linear functionals in spaces of conditionally integrable functions". The Quarterly Journal of Mathematics. Oxford Second Series. 1 (1): 288–298. Bibcode:1950QJMat...1..288S. doi:10.1093/qmath/1.1.288. hdl:10338.dmlcz/140532.
- Sargent, W. L. C. (1950b). "On the continuity (C) and integrability (CP) of fractional integrals". Proceedings of the London Mathematical Society. Second Series. 52 (1): 253–270. doi:10.1112/plms/s2-52.4.253.
- Sargent, W. L. C. (1950c). "On generalized derivatives and Cesàro–Denjoy integrals". Proceedings of the London Mathematical Society. Second Series. 52 (1): 365–376. doi:10.1112/plms/s2-52.5.365.
- Sargent, W. L. C. (1951a). "Some properties of C_{λ}-continuous functions". Journal of the London Mathematical Society. First Series. 26 (2): 116–121. doi:10.1112/jlms/s1-26.2.116.
- Sargent, W. L. C. (1951b). "On the integrability of a product (II)". Journal of the London Mathematical Society. First Series. 26 (4): 278–285. doi:10.1112/jlms/s1-26.4.278.
- Sargent, W. L. C. (1951c). "2213. On the differentiation of a function of a function". The Mathematical Gazette. 35 (312): 121–122. doi:10.2307/3609346. JSTOR 3609346.
- Sargent, W. L. C. (1952a). "On the summability of infinite integrals". Journal of the London Mathematical Society. First Series. 27 (4): 401–413. doi:10.1112/jlms/s1-27.4.401.
- Sargent, W. L. C. (1952b). "Book review: Éléments de Mathématiques. XII by N. Bourbaki". The Mathematical Gazette. 36 (317): 216–217. doi:10.2307/3608266. JSTOR 3608266.
- Sargent, W. L. C. (1952b). "Book review: Vorlesungen über Fouriersche Integrale by S. Bochner". The Mathematical Gazette. 36 (317): 217–218. doi:10.2307/3608268. JSTOR 3608268.
- Sargent, W. L. C. (1953). "On some theorems of Hahn, Banach and Steinhaus". Journal of the London Mathematical Society. First Series. 28 (4): 438–451. doi:10.1112/jlms/s1-28.4.438.
- Sargent, W. L. C. (1954). "Book review: Volume and Integral by W. W. Rogosinski". The Mathematical Gazette. 38 (323): 67. doi:10.2307/3609800. JSTOR 3609800.
- Sargent, W. L. C. (1955). "On the transform $\textstyle y_{x}(s)=\int\limits_{0}^{\infty}x(t)k_{s}(t)dt$". Journal of the London Mathematical Society. First Series. 30 (4): 401–416. doi:10.1112/jlms/s1-30.4.401.
- Sargent, W. L. C. (1957a). "Some summability factor theorems for infinite integrals". Journal of the London Mathematical Society. First Series. 32 (4): 387–396. doi:10.1112/jlms/s1-32.4.387.
- Sargent, W. L. C. (1957b). "On some cases of distinction between integrals and series". Proceedings of the London Mathematical Society. Third Series. 7 (1): 249–264. doi:10.1112/plms/s3-7.1.249.
- Sargent, W. L. C. (1960). "Some sequence spaces related to the l_{p} spaces". Journal of the London Mathematical Society. First Series. 35 (2): 161–171. doi:10.1112/jlms/s1-35.2.161.
- Sargent, W. L. C. (1961). "Some analogues and extensions of Marcinkiewicz's interpolation problem". Proceedings of the London Mathematical Society. Third Series. 11 (1): 457–468. doi:10.1112/plms/s3-11.1.457.
- Sargent, W. L. C. (1964). "On sectionally bounded BK-spaces". Mathematische Zeitschrift. 83 (1): 57–66. doi:10.1007/BF01111108. S2CID 119753065.
- Sargent, W. L. C. (1966). "On compact matrix transformations between sectionally bounded BK-spaces". Journal of the London Mathematical Society. First Series. 41 (1): 79–87. doi:10.1112/jlms/s1-41.1.79.
