= Ba space =

Class of Banach spaces

In mathematics, the ba space $ba(\Sigma)$ of an algebra of sets $\Sigma$ is the Banach space consisting of all bounded and finitely additive signed measures on $\Sigma$. The norm is defined as the variation, that is $\|\nu\|=|\nu|(X).$

If Σ is a sigma-algebra, then the space $ca(\Sigma)$ is defined as the subset of $ba(\Sigma)$ consisting of countably additive measures. The notation ba is a mnemonic for bounded additive and ca is short for countably additive.

If X is a topological space, and Σ is the sigma-algebra of Borel sets in X, then $rca(X)$ is the subspace of $ca(\Sigma)$ consisting of all regular Borel measures on X.

== Properties ==
All three spaces are complete (they are Banach spaces) with respect to the same norm defined by the total variation, and thus $ca(\Sigma)$ is a closed subset of $ba(\Sigma)$, and $rca(X)$ is a closed set of $ca(\Sigma)$ for Σ the algebra of Borel sets on X. The space of simple functions on $\Sigma$ is dense in $ba(\Sigma)$.

The ba space of the power set of the natural numbers, ba(2^{N}), is often denoted as simply $ba$ and is isomorphic to the dual space of the ℓ^{∞} space.

=== Dual of B(Σ) ===
Let B(Σ) be the space of bounded Σ-measurable functions, equipped with the uniform norm. Then ba(Σ) = B(Σ)* is the continuous dual space of B(Σ). This is due to Hildebrandt and Fichtenholtz & Kantorovich. This is a kind of Riesz representation theorem which allows for a measure to be represented as a linear functional on measurable functions. In particular, this isomorphism allows one to define the integral with respect to a finitely additive measure (note that the usual Lebesgue integral requires countable additivity). This is due to Dunford & Schwartz, and is often used to define the integral with respect to vector measures, and especially vector-valued Radon measures.

The topological duality ba(Σ) = B(Σ)* is easy to see. There is an obvious algebraic duality between the vector space of all finitely additive measures σ on Σ and the vector space of simple functions ($\mu(A)=\zeta\left(1_A\right)$). It is easy to check that the linear form induced by σ is continuous in the sup-norm if σ is bounded, and the result follows since a linear form on the dense subspace of simple functions extends to an element of B(Σ)* if it is continuous in the sup-norm.

=== Dual of L^{∞}(μ) ===
If Σ is a sigma-algebra and μ is a sigma-additive positive measure on Σ then the Lp space L^{∞}(μ) endowed with the essential supremum norm is by definition the quotient space of B(Σ) by the closed subspace of bounded μ-null functions:

$$N_\mu:=\{f\in B(\Sigma) : f = 0 \ \mu\text{-almost everywhere} \}.$$

The dual Banach space L^{∞}(μ)* is thus isomorphic to

$$N_\mu^\perp=\{\sigma\in ba(\Sigma) : \mu(A)=0\Rightarrow \sigma(A)= 0 \text{ for any }A\in\Sigma\},$$

i.e. the space of finitely additive signed measures on Σ that are absolutely continuous with respect to μ (μ-a.c. for short).

When the measure space is furthermore sigma-finite then L^{∞}(μ) is in turn dual to L^{1}(μ), which by the Radon–Nikodym theorem is identified with the set of all countably additive μ-a.c. measures. In other words, the inclusion in the bidual

$$L^1(\mu)\subset L^1(\mu)^{**}=L^{\infty}(\mu)^*$$

is isomorphic to the inclusion of the space of countably additive μ-a.c. bounded measures inside the space of all finitely additive μ-a.c. bounded measures.

== See also ==
- List of Banach spaces
