= Belper School =

Belper School and Sixth Form Centre
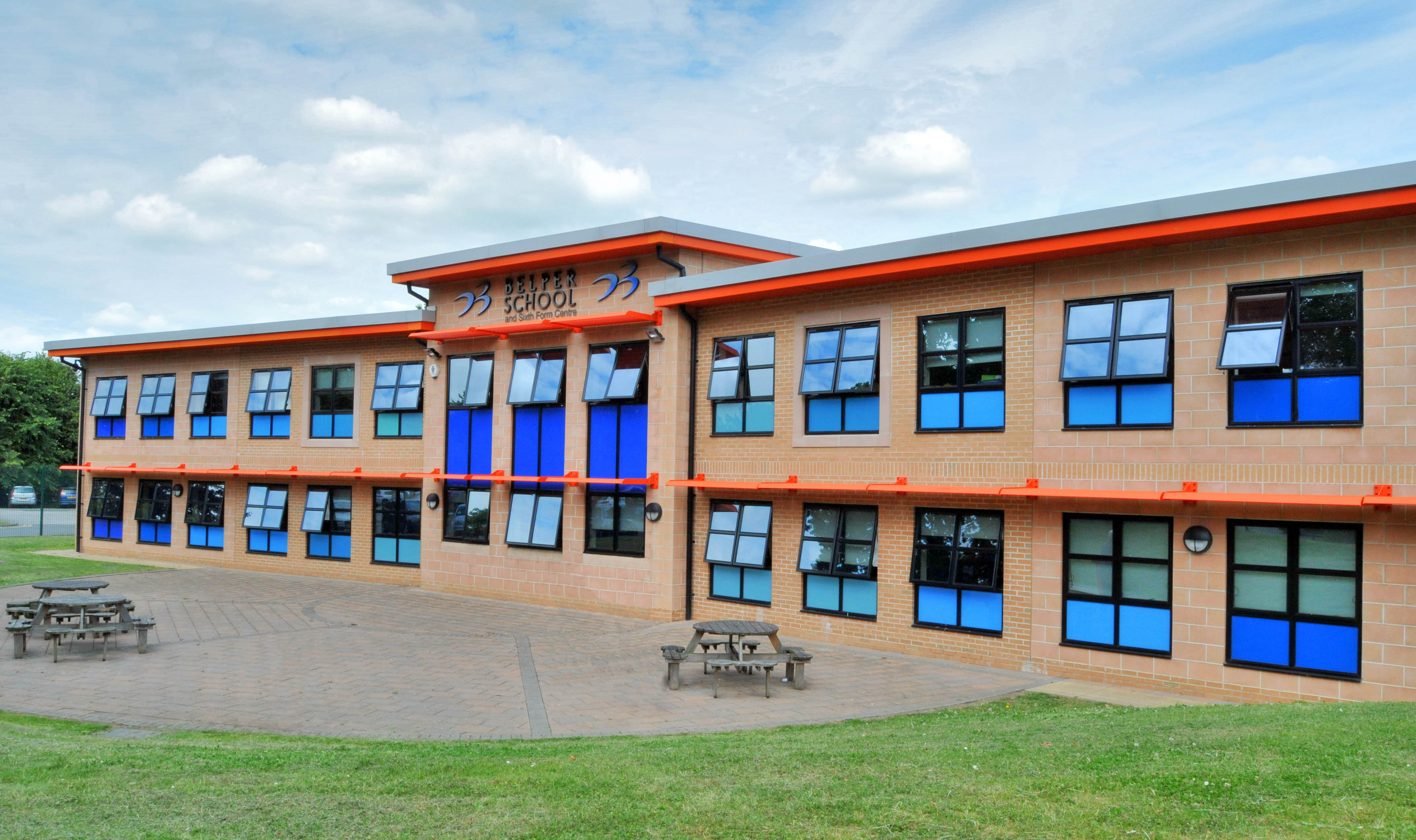

Location
- John O'Gaunt's Way; Belper, Derbyshire, DE56 ODA; England; 53°01′35″N 1°27′25″W

Information
- Type: Foundation school
- Established: 1973
- Local authority: Derbyshire
- Department for Education URN: 112989 Tables
- Ofsted: Reports
- Headteacher: Matilde Warden
- Gender: Coeducational
- Age: 11 to 18
- Enrolment: Approximately 1,300
- Website: http://www.belperschool.co.uk

Belper School and Sixth Form Centre is a foundation secondary school located in the north-east of Belper, Derbyshire, England. In October 2019, Ofsted reported that its overall effectiveness is 'Needs Improvement'.

It has received Healthy Schools status and the Artsmark Gold award. The current headteacher is Mrs Matilde Warden.

== Admissions ==
Belper School is larger than average, catering for 1,311 students as of academic year 2015–2016, a 10.5% reduction since 2012–2013 when the school taught 1169 students between 11 and 18 years old – a decrease attributed by the headteacher to variations in birth rate. The majority of the school is white British with below average numbers of cared-for children and children identified as having special educational needs or disability.

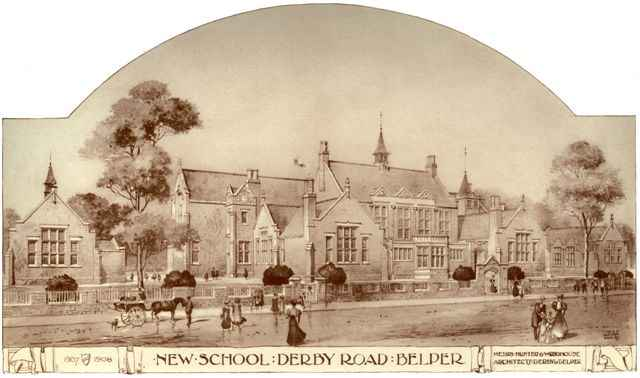
Herbert Strutt School

=== Chemical spill and fire ===
On Wednesday 17 September 2004, the school made national news after a chemical spill occurred within the Science department. Iodine crystals were dropped by a teacher when they collided with a student in a corridor. As a result, two pupils had minor burns and 36 were taken to hospital for smoke inhalation.

== Notable former pupils ==
- Ross Davenport, Gold medalist swimmer (1984– )
- Alison Hargreaves, Mountaineer (1963–1995)
- Nigel Vardy, Mountaineer (1969–)

=== The Herbert Strutt School ===
- Sir Alan Bates CBE, actor in 1960s kitchen sink realism films
- Campbell Burnap, jazz trombonist
- Reginald Coates, Professor of Civil Engineering from 1983 to 2004 at the University of Nottingham and President from 1978 to 1979 of the Institution of Civil Engineers
- Anthony Critchlow, drummer for Living in a Box
- Timothy Dalton, actor notably in The Living Daylights and Licence to Kill
- Edward Eisner, physicist, Professor of Applied Physics from 1968 to 1987 at the University of Strathclyde
- Simon Groom, Blue Peter presenter in the 1980s
- Graham Haberfield, Coronation Street actor
- Prof David Leslie Hawksworth CBE, mycologist and lichenologist, Research Professor since 2001 at the Universidad Complutense de Madrid (Complutense University of Madrid), President from 1986 to 1987 of the British Lichen Society, from 1990 to 1991 of the British Mycological Society and from 1994 to 1997 of the International Union of Biological Sciences, and Editor from 2000 to 2008 of Mycological Research
- Mike Ingham, Chief Football Correspondent since 2004 at BBC Radio 5 Live
- Suzy Kendall, actress, first wife of Dudley Moore
- David Kinnersley, economist (educated as a wartime evacuee), and first Chief executive from 1973 to 1976 of the North West Water Authority
- Prof Larry Rotherham CBE, metallurgist, President from 1964 to 1965 of the Institution of Metallurgists, and from 1965 to 1966 of the Institute of Metals, expert on creep-resistant materials heading the team that discovered how metal fatigue brought down early de Havilland Comet airliners, and Vice-Chancellor from 1969 to 1976 of the University of Bath
- Winifred Sargent, mathematician
- Prof William Watson CBE, Professor of Chinese Art and Archaeology from 1966 to 1983 at the School of Oriental and African Studies, and President from 1981 to 1984 of the Oriental Ceramic Society
