= Algebra extension =

Surjective ring homomorphism with a given codomain

In abstract algebra, an algebra extension is the ring-theoretic equivalent of a group extension.

Precisely, a ring extension of a ring R by an abelian group I is a pair (E, $\phi$) consisting of a ring E and a ring homomorphism $\phi$ that fits into the short exact sequence of abelian groups:

$0 \to I \to E \overset{\phi}{{}\to{}} R \to 0.$

This makes I isomorphic to a two-sided ideal of E.

Given a commutative ring A, an A-extension or an extension of an A-algebra is defined in the same way by replacing "ring" with "algebra over A" and "abelian groups" with "A-modules".

An extension is said to be trivial or to split if $\phi$ splits; i.e., $\phi$ admits a section that is a ring homomorphism (see § Example: trivial extension).

A morphism between extensions of R by I, over say A, is an algebra homomorphism E → E' that induces the identities on I and R. By the five lemma, such a morphism is necessarily an isomorphism, and so two extensions are equivalent if there is a morphism between them.

== Trivial extension example ==
Let R be a commutative ring and M an R-module. Let E = R ⊕ M be the direct sum of abelian groups. Define the multiplication on E by

$$(a, x) \cdot (b, y) = (ab, ay + bx).$$

Note that identifying (a, x) with a + εx where ε squares to zero and expanding out (a + εx)(b + εy) yields the above formula; in particular we see that E is a ring. It is sometimes called the algebra of dual numbers. Alternatively, E can be defined as $\operatorname{Sym}(M)/\bigoplus_{n \ge 2} \operatorname{Sym}^n(M)$ where $\operatorname{Sym}(M)$ is the symmetric algebra of M. We then have the short exact sequence

$$0 \to M \to E \overset{p}{{}\to{}} R \to 0$$

where p is the projection. Hence, E is an extension of R by M. It is trivial since $r \mapsto (r, 0)$ is a section (note this section is a ring homomorphism since $(1, 0)$ is the multiplicative identity of E). Conversely, every trivial extension E of R by I is isomorphic to $R \oplus I$ if $I^2 = 0$. Indeed, identifying $R$ as a subring of E using a section, we have $(E, \phi) \simeq (R \oplus I, p)$ via $e \mapsto (\phi(e), e - \phi(e))$.

One interesting feature of this construction is that the module M becomes an ideal of some new ring. In his book Local Rings, Nagata calls this process the principle of idealization.

== Square-zero extension ==
Especially in deformation theory, it is common to consider an extension R of a ring (commutative or not) by an ideal whose square is zero. Such an extension is called a square-zero extension, a square extension or just an extension. For a square-zero ideal I, since I is contained in the left and right annihilators of itself, I is a $R/I$-bimodule.

More generally, an extension by a nilpotent ideal is called a nilpotent extension. For example, the quotient $R \to R_{\mathrm{red}}$ of a Noetherian commutative ring by the nilradical is a nilpotent extension.

In general,

$$0 \to I^n/I^{n-1} \to R/I^{n-1} \to R/I^n \to 0$$

is a square-zero extension. Thus, a nilpotent extension breaks up into successive square-zero extensions. Because of this, it is usually enough to study square-zero extensions in order to understand nilpotent extensions.

== See also ==
- Formally smooth map
- The Wedderburn principal theorem, a statement about an extension by the Jacobson radical.
