= Edward Eisner =

Hungarian-British physicist

Edward Eisner FRSE FIP (20 December 1929 – 25 December 1987) was a Hungarian-born physicist who was Professor of Applied Physics at the University of Strathclyde from 1968 to 1987. He specialised in the physics of sound.

The "Edward Eisner Memorial Fund Award" is named in his honour.

== Life ==
Eisner was born in Sárvár in Hungary on 20 December 1929. He came to Britain with his family in the 1930s and attended the Herbert Strutt School in Belper in Derbyshire from 1939. He won a place at Gonville and Caius College, Cambridge, to study Physics and graduated BA in 1950, gaining a doctorate (PhD) in 1954. From 1954 he worked with the Ministry of Power at Buxton. In 1960 he went to America to work with the Bell Telephone Laboratory in New Jersey, working on the improvement of handsets. In 1968 he returned to Britain to take the chair in Applied Physics at Strathclyde University retaining this role until death. He was replaced by Prof Gordon Donaldson.

In 1969 he wrote an open letter to NASA suggesting how to improve their television broadcasts from the Moon. In 1977 he was elected a Fellow of the Royal Society of Edinburgh. His proposers were Kenneth Jack Standley, Nicholas Kemmer, Simon G G MacDonald, and William Cochran. He died on Christmas Day 1987.
