= Direct sum of topological groups =

In mathematics, a topological group $G$ is called the topological direct sum of two subgroups $H_1$ and $H_2$ if the map
$$\begin{align}
H_1\times H_2 &\longrightarrow G \\
(h_1,h_2)     &\longmapsto     h_1 h_2
\end{align}$$
is a topological isomorphism, meaning that it is a homeomorphism and a group isomorphism.

== Definition ==
More generally, $G$ is called the direct sum of a finite set of subgroups $H_1, \ldots, H_n$ of the map
$$\begin{align}
\prod^n_{i=1} H_i &\longrightarrow G \\
(h_i)_{i\in I}    &\longmapsto     h_1 h_2 \cdots h_n
\end{align}$$
is a topological isomorphism.

If a topological group $G$ is the topological direct sum of the family of subgroups $H_1, \ldots, H_n$ then in particular, as an abstract group (without topology) it is also the direct sum (in the usual way) of the family $H_i.$

== Topological direct summands ==
Given a topological group $G,$ we say that a subgroup $H$ is a topological direct summand of $G$ (or that splits topologically from $G$) if and only if there exist another subgroup $K \leq G$ such that $G$ is the direct sum of the subgroups $H$ and $K.$

A the subgroup $H$ is a topological direct summand if and only if the extension of topological groups
$$0 \to H\stackrel{i}{{} \to {}} G\stackrel{\pi}{{} \to {}} G/H\to 0$$
splits, where $i$ is the natural inclusion and $\pi$ is the natural projection.

== Examples ==
Suppose that $G$ is a locally compact abelian group that contains the unit circle $\mathbb{T}$ as a subgroup. Then $\mathbb{T}$ is a topological direct summand of $G.$ The same assertion is true for the real numbers $\R$.

== See also ==
- Complemented subspace – Concept in functional analysis
- Direct sum – Operation in abstract algebra composing objects into "more complicated" objects
- Direct sum of modules – Operation in abstract algebra
