= L-infinity =

Space of bounded sequences

In mathematics, $\ell^\infty$, the (real or complex) vector space of bounded sequences with the supremum norm, and $L^\infty = L^\infty(X,\Sigma,\mu)$, the vector space of essentially bounded measurable functions with the essential supremum norm, are two closely related Banach spaces. In fact the former is a special case of the latter. As a Banach space they are, respectively, the continuous dual of the Banach spaces $\ell_1$ of absolutely summable sequences, and $L^1 = L^1(X,\Sigma, \mu)$ of absolutely integrable measurable functions (if the measure space fulfills the conditions of being localizable and therefore semifinite). Pointwise multiplication gives them the structure of a Banach algebra, and in fact they are the standard examples of abelian Von Neumann algebras.

== Sequence space ==
The vector space $\ell^\infty$ is a sequence space whose elements are the bounded sequences. The vector space operations, addition and scalar multiplication, are applied coordinate by coordinate. With respect to the norm
$$\|x\|_\infty = \sup_n |x_n|$$
$\ell^\infty$ is a standard example of a Banach space. In fact, $\ell^\infty$ can be considered as the $\ell^p$ space with the largest $p$.

This space is the strong dual space of $\ell^1$: indeed, every $x \in \ell^\infty$ defines a continuous functional on the space $\ell^1$ of absolutely summable sequences by component-wise multiplication and summing:

$$\begin{align}
\ell^\infty &\to ({\ell^1})' \end{align}$$

via

$$\begin{align}
x &\mapsto \left(y \mapsto \sum_{i = 1}^\infty x_iy_i \right)
\end{align}$$

By evaluating on $(0,\ldots,0,1,0,\ldots)$ we see that every continuous linear functional on $\ell^1$ arises in this way. i.e.

$$({\ell^1})' = \ell^\infty$$

However, not every continuous linear functional on $\ell^\infty$ arises from an absolutely summable series in $\ell^1,$ and hence $\ell^\infty$ is not a reflexive Banach space.

== Function space ==
$L^\infty$ is a function space. Its elements are the essentially bounded measurable functions.

More precisely, $L^\infty$ is defined based on an underlying measure space, $(S, \Sigma, \mu).$ Start with the set of all measurable functions from $S$ to $\R$ which are essentially bounded, that is, bounded except on a set of measure zero. Two such functions are identified if they are equal almost everywhere. Denote the resulting set by $L^{\infty}(S, \mu).$

For a function $f$ in this set, its essential supremum serves as an appropriate norm:
$$\|f\|_\infty \equiv \inf \{C \geq 0 : |f(x)| \leq C \text{ for almost every } x\}.$$
This norm is the uniform norm. It is an $L^p$ norm for $p=\infty.$

The sequence space is a special case of the function space: $\ell^\infty = L^\infty(\mathbb{N})$ where the natural numbers are equipped with the counting measure.

== Applications ==
One application of $\ell^\infty$ and $L^\infty$ is in economics, particularly in the study of economies with infinitely many commodities. In simple economic models, it is common to assume that there is only a finite number of different commodities, e.g. houses, fruits, cars, etc., so every bundle can be represented by a finite vector, and the consumption set is a vector space with a finite dimension. But in reality, the number of different commodities may be infinite. For example, a "house" is not a single commodity type since the value of a house depends on its location. So the number of different commodities is the number of different locations, which may be considered infinite. In this case, the consumption set is naturally represented by $L^\infty.$

== See also ==
- Uniform norm – Function in mathematical analysis
- Chebyshev distance – Mathematical metric
