= Leonard Rotherham =

British metallurgist (1913–2001)

- Born: 31 August 1913; Sutton in Ashfield, Nottinghamshire, England
- Died: 21 March 2001 (aged 87); Horningsham, Wiltshire, England
- Education: University College London
- Scientific career
- Fields: Metallurgy

Leonard "Larry" Rotherham CBE FRS (31 August 1913 – 21 March 2001) was a British metallurgist and vice chancellor of the University of Bath. He led the team which investigated the de Havilland Comet airliner crashes caused by metal fatigue around the windows.

He was educated at Herbert Strutt School, Belper and University College London. He worked as a physicist at Brown Firth Research Laboratories on high melting point alloys. from 1935 until 1946 when he was appointed at head of the Metallurgy Department at the RAE Farnborough. He remained there until 1954 when he was appointed director of Research and Development of the United Kingdom Atomic Energy Authority's Industrial Group based at Risley. He became the member for Research on the CEGB in 1958, a role he remained in until 1969 when he was appointed vice chancellor of the University of Bath until his retirement in 1976. Following his retirement he became a governor of Imperial College, London and a director of Chemring plc.

He was appointed a Fellow of the Royal Society in 1963 and appointed a CBE in 1970. He was awarded an Honorary Degree (Doctor of Science) by the University of Bath in 1976.

He married Nora Thompson in 1937 (and who died in 1991) and they had one son and two daughters.

Academic offices
Preceded by George Moore	Vice-Chancellor of the University of Bath; 1969-1976	Succeeded by Paul Taunton Matthews
