= Extension of a topological group =

In mathematics, more specifically in topological groups, an extension of topological groups, or a topological extension, is a short exact sequence $0\to H\stackrel{\imath}{\to} X \stackrel{\pi}{\to}G\to 0$ where $H, X$ and $G$ are topological groups and $i$ and $\pi$ are continuous homomorphisms which are also open onto their images. Every extension of topological groups is therefore a group extension.

== Classification of extensions of topological groups ==
We say that the topological extensions

$$0 \rightarrow H\stackrel{i}{\rightarrow} X\stackrel{\pi}{\rightarrow} G\rightarrow 0$$

and

$$0\to H\stackrel{i'}{\rightarrow} X'\stackrel{\pi'}{\rightarrow} G\rightarrow 0$$

are equivalent (or congruent) if there exists a topological isomorphism $T: X\to X'$ making commutative the diagram of Figure 1.

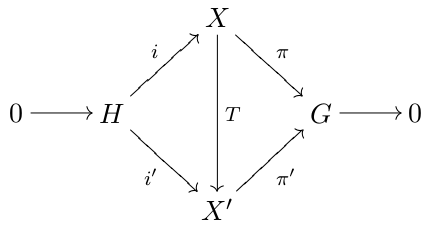
Figure 1

We say that the topological extension

$$0 \rightarrow H\stackrel{i}{\rightarrow} X\stackrel{\pi}{\rightarrow} G\rightarrow 0$$

is a split extension (or splits) if it is equivalent to the trivial extension

$$0 \rightarrow H\stackrel{i_H}{\rightarrow} H\times G\stackrel{\pi_G}{\rightarrow} G\rightarrow 0$$

where $i_H: H\to H\times G$ is the natural inclusion over the first factor and $\pi_G: H\times G\to G$ is the natural projection over the second factor.

It is easy to prove that the topological extension $0 \rightarrow H\stackrel{i}{\rightarrow} X\stackrel{\pi}{\rightarrow} G\rightarrow 0$ splits if and only if there is a continuous homomorphism $R: X \rightarrow H$ such that $R\circ i$ is the identity map on $H$

Note that the topological extension $0 \rightarrow H\stackrel{i}{\rightarrow} X\stackrel{\pi}{\rightarrow} G\rightarrow 0$ splits if and only if the subgroup $i(H)$ is a topological direct summand of $X$

== Examples ==
- Take $\mathbb R$ the real numbers and $\mathbb Z$ the integer numbers. Take $\imath$ the natural inclusion and $\pi$ the natural projection. Then

$$0\to \mathbb Z\stackrel{\imath}{\to} \mathbb R \stackrel{\pi}{\to}\mathbb R/\mathbb Z\to 0$$

is an extension of topological abelian groups. Indeed it is an example of a non-splitting extension.

== Extensions of locally compact abelian groups (LCA) ==
An extension of topological abelian groups will be a short exact sequence $0\to H\stackrel{\imath}{\to} X \stackrel{\pi}{\to}G\to 0$ where $H, X$ and $G$ are locally compact abelian groups and $i$ and $\pi$ are relatively open continuous homomorphisms.

- Let be an extension of locally compact abelian groups

$$0\to H\stackrel{\imath}{\to} X \stackrel{\pi}{\to}G\to 0.$$

Take $H^\wedge, X^\wedge$ and $G^\wedge$ the Pontryagin duals of $H, X$ and $G$ and take $i^\wedge$ and $\pi^\wedge$ the dual maps of $i$ and $\pi$. Then the sequence

$$0\to G^\wedge\stackrel{\pi^\wedge}{\to} X^\wedge \stackrel{\imath^\wedge}{\to}H^\wedge\to 0$$

is an extension of locally compact abelian groups.

== Extensions of topological abelian groups by the unit circle ==
A very special kind of topological extensions are the ones of the form $0 \rightarrow \mathbb T\stackrel{i}{\rightarrow} X\stackrel{\pi}{\rightarrow} G\rightarrow 0$ where $\mathbb T$ is the unit circle and $X$ and $G$ are topological abelian groups.

=== The class S(T) ===
A topological abelian group $G$ belongs to the class $\mathcal S (\mathbb T)$ if and only if every topological extension of the form $0 \rightarrow \mathbb T\stackrel{i}{\rightarrow} X\stackrel{\pi}{\rightarrow} G\rightarrow 0$ splits

- Every locally compact abelian group belongs to $\mathcal S (\mathbb T)$. In other words every topological extension $0 \rightarrow \mathbb T\stackrel{i}{\rightarrow} X\stackrel{\pi}{\rightarrow} G\rightarrow 0$ where $G$ is a locally compact abelian group, splits.
- Every locally precompact abelian group belongs to $\mathcal S (\mathbb T)$.
- The Banach space (and in particular topological abelian group) $\ell^1$ does not belong to $\mathcal S (\mathbb T)$.
