= Direct sum of groups =

Means of constructing a group from two subgroups

In mathematics, a group G is called the direct sum of two normal subgroups with trivial intersection if it is generated by the subgroups. In abstract algebra, this method of construction of groups can be generalized to direct sums of vector spaces, modules, and other structures; see the article direct sum of modules for more information. A group which can be expressed as a direct sum of non-trivial subgroups is called decomposable, and if a group cannot be expressed as such a direct sum then it is called indecomposable.

== Definition ==
A group G is called the direct sum of two subgroups H_{1} and H_{2} if

- each H_{1} and H_{2} are normal subgroups of G,
- the subgroups H_{1} and H_{2} have trivial intersection (i.e., having only the identity element $e$ of G in common),
- G = ⟨H_{1}, H_{2}⟩; in other words, G is generated by the subgroups H_{1} and H_{2}.

More generally, G is called the direct sum of a finite set of subgroups {H_{i}} if

- each H_{i} is a normal subgroup of G,
- each H_{i} has trivial intersection with the subgroup ⟨{H_{j} : j ≠ i}⟩,
- G = ⟨{H_{i}}⟩; in other words, G is generated by the subgroups {H_{i}}.

If G is the direct sum of subgroups H and K then we write G = H + K, and if G is the direct sum of a set of subgroups {H_{i}} then we often write G = ΣH_{i}. Loosely speaking, a direct sum is isomorphic to a weak direct product of subgroups.

== Properties ==
If G = H + K, then it can be proven that:

- for all h in H, k in K, we have that h ∗ k = k ∗ h
- for all g in G, there exists unique h in H, k in K such that g = h ∗ k
- There is a cancellation of the sum in a quotient; so that (H + K)/K is isomorphic to H

The above assertions can be generalized to the case of G = ΣH_{i}, where {H_{i}} is a finite set of subgroups:

- if i ≠ j, then for all h_{i} in H_{i}, h_{j} in H_{j}, we have that h_{i} ∗ h_{j} = h_{j} ∗ h_{i}
- for each g in G, there exists a unique set of elements h_{i} in H_{i} such that

g = h_{1} ∗ h_{2} ∗ ... ∗ h_{i} ∗ ... ∗ h_{n}

- There is a cancellation of the sum in a quotient; so that ((ΣH_{i}) + K)/K is isomorphic to ΣH_{i}.

Note the similarity with the direct product, where each g can be expressed uniquely as

g = (h_{1},h_{2}, ..., h_{i}, ..., h_{n}).

Since h_{i} ∗ h_{j} = h_{j} ∗ h_{i} for all i ≠ j, it follows that multiplication of elements in a direct sum is isomorphic to multiplication of the corresponding elements in the direct product; thus for finite sets of subgroups, ΣH_{i} is isomorphic to the direct product ×{H_{i}}.

== Direct summand ==
Given a group $G$, we say that a subgroup $H$ is a direct summand of $G$ if there exists another subgroup $K$ of $G$ such that $G = H+K$.

In abelian groups, if $H$ is a divisible subgroup of $G$, then $H$ is a direct summand of $G$.

== Examples ==
- If we take $G= \prod_{i\in I} H_i$ it is clear that $G$ is the direct product of the subgroups $H_{i_0} \times \prod_{i\not=i_0}H_i$.
- If $H$ is a divisible subgroup of an abelian group $G$ then there exists another subgroup $K$ of $G$ such that $G=K+H$.
- If $G$ also has a vector space structure then $G$ can be written as a direct sum of $\mathbb R$ and another subspace $K$ that will be isomorphic to the quotient $G/K$.

== Equivalence of decompositions into direct sums ==
In the decomposition of a finite group into a direct sum of indecomposable subgroups the embedding of the subgroups is not unique. For example, in the Klein group $V_4 \cong C_2 \times C_2$ we have that

$V_4 = \langle(0,1)\rangle + \langle(1,0)\rangle,$ and
$$V_4 = \langle(1,1)\rangle + \langle(1,0)\rangle.$$

However, the Remak-Krull-Schmidt theorem states that given a finite group G = ΣA_{i} = ΣB_{j}, where each A_{i} and each B_{j} is non-trivial and indecomposable, the two sums have equal terms up to reordering and isomorphism.

The Remak-Krull-Schmidt theorem fails for infinite groups; so in the case of infinite G = H + K = L + M, even when all subgroups are non-trivial and indecomposable, we cannot conclude that H is isomorphic to either L or M.

== Generalization to sums over infinite sets ==
To describe the above properties in the case where G is the direct sum of an infinite (perhaps uncountable) set of subgroups, more care is needed.

If g is an element of the cartesian product Π{H_{i}} of a set of groups, let g_{i} be the ith element of g in the product. The external direct sum of a set of groups {H_{i}} (written as Σ_{E}{H_{i}}) is the subset of Π{H_{i}}, where, for each element g of Σ_{E}{H_{i}}, g_{i} is the identity $e_{H_i}$ for all but a finite number of g_{i} (equivalently, only a finite number of g_{i} are not the identity). The group operation in the external direct sum is pointwise multiplication, as in the usual direct product.

This subset does indeed form a group, and for a finite set of groups {H_{i}} the external direct sum is equal to the direct product.

If G = ΣH_{i}, then G is isomorphic to Σ_{E}{H_{i}}. Thus, in a sense, the direct sum is an "internal" external direct sum. For each element g in G, there is a unique finite set S and a unique set {h_{i} ∈ H_{i} : i ∈ S} such that g = Π {h_{i} : i in S}.

== See also ==
- Direct sum
- Coproduct
- Free product
- Direct sum of topological groups
