= Group extension =

Group for which a given group is a normal subgroup

Extension of $Q$ by $N$, resulting in the group $G$. They form a short exact sequence $1\to N\;\overset{\iota}{\to}\;G\;\overset{\pi}{\to}\;Q \to 1$. The injective homomorphism $\iota$ maps $N$ to a normal subgroup of $G$. In turn, $\pi$ maps $G$ onto $Q$, sending each coset of $\iota(N)$ to a different element of $Q$.

In mathematics, a group extension is a general means of describing a group in terms of a particular normal subgroup and quotient group. If $Q$ and $N$ are two groups, then $G$ is an extension of $Q$ by $N$ if there is a short exact sequence

$$1\to N\;\overset{\iota}{\to}\;G\;\overset{\pi}{\to}\;Q \to 1.$$

If $G$ is an extension of $Q$ by $N$, then $G$ is a group, $\iota(N)$ is a normal subgroup of $G$ and the quotient group $G/\iota(N)$ is isomorphic to the group $Q$. Group extensions arise in the context of the extension problem, where the groups $Q$ and $N$ are known and the properties of $G$ are to be determined. Note that the phrasing "$G$ is an extension of $N$ by $Q$" is also used by some.

Since any finite group $G$ possesses a maximal normal subgroup $N$ with simple factor group $G/\iota(N)$, all finite groups may be constructed as a series of extensions with finite simple groups. This fact was a motivation for completing the classification of finite simple groups.

An extension is called a central extension if the subgroup $N$ lies in the center of $G$.

== Extensions in general ==
One extension, the direct product, is immediately obvious. If one requires $G$ and $Q$ to be abelian groups, then the set of isomorphism classes of extensions of $Q$ by a given (abelian) group $N$ is in fact a group, which is isomorphic to

$$\operatorname{Ext}^1_{\mathbb Z}(Q,N);$$

cf. the Ext functor. Several other general classes of extensions are known but no theory exists that treats all the possible extensions at one time. Group extension is usually described as a hard problem; it is termed the extension problem.

To consider some examples, if $G=K\times H$, then $G$ is an extension of both $H$ and $K$. More generally, if $G$ is a semidirect product of $K$ and $H$, written as $G=K\rtimes H$, then $G$ is an extension of $H$ by $K$, so such products as the wreath product provide further examples of extensions.

=== Extension problem ===
The question of what groups $G$ are extensions of $H$ by $N$ is called the extension problem, and has been studied heavily since the late nineteenth century. As to its motivation, consider that the composition series of a finite group is a finite sequence of subgroups $\{A_i\}$, where each $\{A_{i+1}\}$ is an extension of $\{A_i\}$ by some simple group. The classification of finite simple groups gives us a complete list of finite simple groups; so the solution to the extension problem would give us enough information to construct and classify all finite groups in general.

=== Classifying extensions ===
Solving the extension problem amounts to classifying all extensions of $H$ by $K$; or more practically, by expressing all such extensions in terms of mathematical objects that are easier to understand and compute. In general, this problem is very hard, and all the most useful results classify extensions that satisfy some additional condition.

It is important to know when two extensions are equivalent or congruent. We say that the extensions

$$1 \to K\stackrel{i}{{}\to{}} G\stackrel{\pi}{{}\to{}} H\to 1$$

and

$$1\to K\stackrel{i'}{{}\to{}} G'\stackrel{\pi'}{{}\to{}} H\to 1$$

are equivalent (or congruent) if there exists a group isomorphism $T: G\to G'$ making commutative the diagram below. In fact it is sufficient to have a group homomorphism; due to the assumed commutativity of the diagram, the map $T$ is forced to be an isomorphism by the short five lemma.

==== Warning ====
It may happen that the extensions $1\to K\to G\to H\to 1$ and $1\to K\to G^\prime\to H\to 1$ are inequivalent but $G$ and $G'$ are isomorphic as groups. For instance, there are $8$ inequivalent extensions of the Klein four-group by $\mathbb{Z}/2\mathbb{Z}$, but there are, up to group isomorphism, only four groups of order $8$ containing a normal subgroup of order $2$ with quotient group isomorphic to the Klein four-group.

==== Trivial extensions ====
A trivial extension is an extension

$$1\to K\to G\to H\to 1$$

that is equivalent to the extension

$$1\to K\to K\times H\to H\to 1$$

where the left and right arrows are respectively the inclusion and the projection of each factor of $K\times H$.

==== Classifying split extensions ====
A split extension is an extension

$$1\to K\to G\to H\to 1$$

with a homomorphism $s\colon H \to G$ such that going from $H$ to $G$ by $s$ and then back to $H$ by the quotient map of the short exact sequence induces the identity map on $H$ i.e., $\pi \circ s=\mathrm{id}_H$. In this situation, it is usually said that $s$ splits the above exact sequence.

Split extensions are very easy to classify, because an extension is split if and only if the group $G$ is a semidirect product of $K$ and $H$. Semidirect products themselves are easy to classify, because they are in one-to-one correspondence with homomorphisms from $H\to\operatorname{Aut}(K)$, where $\operatorname{Aut}(K)$ is the automorphism group of $K$. For a full discussion of why this is true, see semidirect product.

==== Warning on terminology ====
In general in mathematics, an extension of a structure $K$ is usually regarded as a structure $L$ of which $K$ is a substructure. See for example field extension. However, in group theory the opposite terminology has crept in, partly because of the notation $\operatorname{Ext}(Q,N)$, which reads easily as extensions of $Q$ by $N$, and the focus is on the group $Q$.

A paper of Ronald Brown and Timothy Porter on Otto Schreier's theory of nonabelian extensions uses the terminology that an extension of $K$ gives a larger structure.

== Central extension ==
A central extension of a group $G$ is a short exact sequence of groups

$$1\to A\to E\to G\to 1$$

such that $A$ is included in $Z(E)$, the center of the group $E$. The set of isomorphism classes of central extensions of $G$ by $A$ is in one-to-one correspondence with the cohomology group $H^2(G,A)$.

Examples of central extensions can be constructed by taking any group $G$ and any abelian group $A$, and setting $E$ to be $A\times G$. This kind of split example corresponds to the element 0 in $H^2(G,A)$ under the above correspondence. More serious examples are found in the theory of projective representations, in cases where the projective representation cannot be lifted to an ordinary linear representation.

In the case of finite perfect groups, there is a universal perfect central extension.

Similarly, the central extension of a Lie algebra $\mathfrak{g}$ is an exact sequence

$$0\rightarrow \mathfrak{a}\rightarrow\mathfrak{e}\rightarrow\mathfrak{g}\rightarrow 0$$

such that $\mathfrak{a}$ is in the center of $\mathfrak{e}$.

There is a general theory of central extensions in Maltsev varieties.

=== Generalization to general extensions ===
There is a similar classification of all extensions of $G$ by $A$ in terms of homomorphisms from $G\to\operatorname{Out}(A)$, a tedious but explicitly checkable existence condition involving $H^3(G, Z(A))$ and the cohomology group $H^2(G, Z(A))$.

=== Lie groups ===
In Lie group theory, central extensions arise in connection with algebraic topology. Roughly speaking, central extensions of Lie groups by discrete groups are the same as covering groups. More precisely, a connected covering space G^{∗} of a connected Lie group G is naturally a central extension of G, in such a way that the projection

$$\pi\colon G^* \to G$$

is a group homomorphism, and surjective. (The group structure on G^{∗} depends on the choice of an identity element mapping to the identity in G.) For example, when G^{∗} is the universal cover of G, the kernel of π is the fundamental group of G, which is known to be abelian (see H-space). Conversely, given a Lie group G and a discrete central subgroup Z, the quotient G/Z is a Lie group and G is a covering space of it.

More generally, when the groups A, E and G occurring in a central extension are Lie groups, and the maps between them are homomorphisms of Lie groups, then if the Lie algebra of G is g, that of A is a, and that of E is e, then e is a central Lie algebra extension of g by a. In the terminology of theoretical physics, generators of a are called central charges. These generators are in the center of e; by Noether's theorem, generators of symmetry groups correspond to conserved quantities, referred to as charges.

The basic examples of central extensions as covering groups are:

- the spin groups, which double cover the special orthogonal groups, which (in even dimension) doubly cover the projective orthogonal group.
- the metaplectic groups, which double cover the symplectic groups.

The case of SL_{2}(R) involves a fundamental group that is infinite cyclic. Here the central extension involved is well known in modular form theory, in the case of forms of weight ½. A projective representation that corresponds is the Weil representation, constructed from the Fourier transform, in this case on the real line. Metaplectic groups also occur in quantum mechanics.

== See also ==
- Algebra extension
- Lie algebra extension
- Virasoro algebra
- HNN extension
- Group contraction
- Extension of a topological group
