= C space =

Space of bounded sequences

In the mathematical field of functional analysis, the space denoted by c is the vector space of all convergent sequences $\left(x_n\right)$ of real numbers or complex numbers. When equipped with the uniform norm:
$$\|x\|_\infty = \sup_n |x_n|$$
the space $c$ becomes a Banach space. It is a closed linear subspace of the space of bounded sequences, $\ell^\infty$, and contains as a closed subspace the Banach space $c_0$ of sequences converging to zero. The dual of $c$ is isometrically isomorphic to $\ell^1,$ as is that of $c_0.$ In particular, neither $c$ nor $c_0$ is reflexive.

In the first case, the isomorphism of $\ell^1$ with $c^*$ is given as follows. If $\left(x_0, x_1, \ldots\right) \in \ell^1,$ then the pairing with an element $\left(y_0, y_1, \ldots\right)$ in $c$ is given by
$$x_0\lim_{n\to\infty} y_n + \sum_{i=0}^\infty x_{i+1} y_i.$$

This is the Riesz representation theorem on the ordinal $\omega$.

For $c_0,$ the pairing between $\left(x_i\right)$ in $\ell^1$ and $\left(y_i\right)$ in $c_0$ is given by
$$\sum_{i=0}^\infty x_iy_i.$$

== See also ==
- Sequence space – Vector space of infinite sequences
