= Direct sum =

Algebraic structure formed from a collection of algebraic structures

In mathematics, more specifically in algebra, the direct sum of a collection of abelian groups is an abelian group constructed by combining the given groups as described below. If the input abelian groups have additional structure (for example, are vector spaces, modules, or topological abelian groups), then the direct sum usually maintains that structure (as an example of the opposite, the direct sum of fields is not a field as it contains zero divisors).

The direct sum of two abelian groups $A$ and $B$ is another abelian group $A\oplus B$ consisting of the ordered pairs $(a,b)$ where $a \in A$ and $b \in B$. The sum $(a, b) + (c, d)$ is defined to be $(a + c, b + d)$; in other words, addition is defined coordinate-wise and it is usually denoted with $+$. For example, the direct sum $\Reals \oplus \Reals$, where $\Reals$ is real coordinate space, is the Cartesian plane, $\R ^2$.

Direct sums can also be formed with any finite number of summands; for example, $A \oplus B \oplus C$, provided $A, B,$ and $C$ are the same kinds of algebraic structures (e.g., all abelian groups, or all vector spaces). That relies on the fact that the direct sum is associative up to isomorphism. That is, $(A \oplus B) \oplus C \cong A \oplus (B \oplus C)$ for any algebraic structures $A$, $B$, and $C$ of the same kind. The direct sum is also commutative up to isomorphism, (i.e. $A \oplus B \cong B \oplus A$) for any algebraic structures $A$ and $B$ of the same kind.

The direct sum of finitely many abelian groups, vector spaces, or modules is canonically isomorphic to the corresponding direct product. In the case where infinitely many objects are combined, the direct sum and direct product are not isomorphic even for abelian groups, vector spaces, or modules. For example, consider the direct sum and the direct product of (countably) infinitely many copies of the integers. An element in the direct product is an infinite sequence, such as (1,2,3,...) but in the direct sum, there is a requirement that all but finitely many coordinates be zero, so the sequence (1,2,3,...) would be an element of the direct product but not of the direct sum, while (1,2,0,0,0,...) would be an element of both. Often, if a + sign is used, all but finitely many coordinates must be zero, while if some form of multiplication is used, all but finitely many coordinates must be 1.

In more technical language, given an indexed family of structures $(A_i)_{i \in I}$, the direct sum
$$A = \bigoplus_{i \in I} A_i$$
is defined to be the set of tuples $(a_i)_{i \in I}$ with $a_i \in A_i$ such that $a_i=0$ for all but finitely many i. Each of the $A_i$ is called a direct summand of $A$. If the set $I$ is finite, the direct sum $\bigoplus_{i \in I} A_i$ is contained in the direct product $\prod_{i \in I} A_i$, but is strictly smaller when the index set $I$ is infinite, because an element of the direct product can have infinitely many nonzero coordinates.

== Examples ==
The xy-plane, a two-dimensional vector space, can be thought of as the direct sum of two one-dimensional vector spaces: the x and y axes. In this direct sum, the x and y axes intersect only at the origin (the zero vector). Addition and scalar mutiplication are both defined coordinate-wise; that is, $(x_1,y_1) + (x_2,y_2) = (x_1+x_2, y_1 + y_2)$, and $\lambda(x, y) = (\lambda x,\lambda y)$ which are the same as in the xy-plane.

=== Internal and external direct sums ===
A distinction is made between internal and external direct sums though both are isomorphic. If the summands are defined first, and the direct sum is then defined in terms of the summands, it is called an external direct sum. For example, if the real numbers $\mathbb{R}$ are defined, followed by $\mathbb{R} \oplus \mathbb{R}$, the direct sum is said to be external.

If, on the other hand, some algebraic structure $S$ is defined, and $S$ is proven to be isomorphic to the direct sum of two (or more) substructures, the direct sum is said to be internal. In that case, each element of $S$ is expressible uniquely as a finite algebraic combination of elements in each of the substructures. For an example of an internal direct sum, consider the ring $\mathbb Z_6$ (the integers modulo six), whose elements are $\{0, 1, 2, 3, 4, 5\}$. This is expressible as an internal direct sum $\mathbb Z_6 = \{0, 2, 4\} \oplus \{0, 3\} \cong \mathbb Z_3 \oplus \mathbb Z_2$.

== Types of direct sums ==
=== Direct sum of abelian groups ===
The direct sum of abelian groups is a prototypical example of a direct sum. Given two such groups $(A, \circ)$ and $(B, \bullet),$ their direct sum $A \oplus B$ is the same as their direct product. That is, the underlying set is the Cartesian product $A \times B$ and the group operation $\,\cdot\,$ is defined component-wise:
$$\left(a_1, b_1\right) \cdot \left(a_2, b_2\right) = \left(a_1 \circ a_2, b_1 \bullet b_2\right).$$
This definition generalizes to direct sums of finitely many abelian groups.

For an arbitrary family of groups $A_i$ indexed by $i \in I,$ their direct sum
$$\bigoplus_{i \in I} A_i$$
is the subgroup of the direct product that consists of the elements $\left(a_i\right)_{i \in I} \in \prod_{i \in I} A_i$ that have finite support, where, by definition, $\left(a_i\right)_{i \in I}$ is said to have finite support if $a_i$ is the identity element of $A_i$ for all but finitely many $i.$ The direct sum of an infinite family $\left(A_i\right)_{i \in I}$ of non-trivial groups is a proper subgroup of the product group $\prod_{i \in I} A_i.$

=== Direct sum of modules ===
The direct sum of modules is a construction that combines several modules into a new module.

The most familiar examples of that construction occur in considering vector spaces, which are modules over a field. The construction may also be extended to Banach spaces and Hilbert spaces.

=== Direct sum in categories ===
An additive category is an abstraction of the properties of the category of modules. In such a category, finite products and coproducts agree, and the direct sum is either of them: cf. biproduct.

More generally, in category theory the direct sum is often but not always the coproduct in the category of the mathematical objects in question. For example, in the category of abelian groups, the direct sum is a coproduct. That is also true in the category of modules.

=== Direct sum of group representations ===
The direct sum of group representations generalizes the direct sum of the underlying modules by adding a group action. Specifically, given a group $G$ and two representations $V$ and $W$ of $G$ (or, more generally, two $G$-modules), the direct sum of the representations is $V \oplus W$ with the action of $g \in G$ given component-wise, that is,
$$g (v, w) := (g v, g  w).$$

An equivalent way of defining the direct sum is as follows: Given two representations $(V, \rho_V)$ and $(W, \rho_W)$ the vector space of the direct sum is $V \oplus W$ and the homomorphism $\rho_{V \oplus W}$ is given by $\alpha \circ (\rho_V \times \rho_W),$ where $\alpha: GL(V) \times GL(W) \to GL(V \oplus W)$ is the natural map obtained by coordinate-wise action as above.

Furthermore, if $V,\,W$ are finite dimensional, then, given a basis of $V,\,W$, $\rho_V$ and $\rho_W$ are matrix-valued. In this case, $\rho_{V \oplus W}$ is given as
$$g \mapsto \begin{pmatrix}\rho_V(g) & 0 \\ 0 & \rho_W(g)\end{pmatrix}.$$

Moreover, if $V$ and $W$ are viewed as modules over the group ring $kG$, where $k$ is the field, the direct sum of the representations $V$ and $W$ is equal to their direct sum as $kG$-modules.

=== Direct sum of rings ===
The direct product $R \times S$ of rings should not be written as $R \oplus S$, since $R \times S$ does not receive natural ring homomorphisms from $R$ and $S$. In particular, the map $R \to R \times S$ sending $r$ to $(r, 0)$ is not a ring homomorphism since it fails to send 1 to $(1, 1)$ (assuming that $0 \neq 1$ in $S$). Thus, $R \times S$ is not a coproduct in the category of rings, and should not be written as a direct sum. (The coproduct in the category of commutative rings is the tensor product of rings. In the category of rings, the coproduct is given by a construction similar to the free product of groups.)

The use of direct sum terminology and notation is especially problematic in dealing with infinite families of rings. If $(R_i)_{i \in I}$ is an infinite collection of nontrivial rings, the direct sum of the underlying additive groups may be equipped with termwise multiplication, but that produces a rng, a ring without a multiplicative identity.

=== Direct sum of matrices ===
If $\mathbf{A}$ is an $m_1 \times n_1$ matrix and $\mathbf{B}$ is an $m_2 \times n_2$ matrix, then the direct sum $\mathbf{A} \oplus \mathbf{B}$ is defined as the $(m_1+m_2)\times(n_1+n_2)$ block diagonal matrix
$$\begin{bmatrix}
\mathbf{A} & 0          \\
0          & \mathbf{B}
\end{bmatrix}.$$

=== Direct sum of topological vector spaces ===
A topological vector space (TVS) $X,$ such as a Banach space, is said to be a topological direct sum of two vector subspaces $M$ and $N$ if the addition map
$$\begin{alignat}{4}
\  \;&& M \times N &&\;\to    \;& X \\[0.3ex]
&& (m, n) &&\;\mapsto\;& m + n \\
\end{alignat}$$
is an isomorphism of topological vector spaces (meaning that this linear map is a bijective homeomorphism) in which case $M$ and $N$ are said to be topological complements in $X.$ That is true if and only if when considered as additive topological groups (so scalar multiplication is ignored), $X$ is the topological direct sum of the topological subgroups $M$ and $N.$ If this is the case and if $X$ is Hausdorff then $M$ and $N$ are necessarily closed subspaces of $X.$

If $M$ is a vector subspace of a real or complex vector space $X$, there is always another vector subspace $N$ of $X,$ called an algebraic complement of $M$ in $X,$ such that $X$ is the algebraic direct sum of $M$ and $N$, which happens if and only if the addition map $M \times N \to X$ is a vector space isomorphism.

In contrast to algebraic direct sums, the existence of such a complement is no longer guaranteed for topological direct sums.

A vector subspace $M$ of $X$ is said to be a (topologically) complemented subspace of $X$ if there exists some vector subspace $N$ of $X$ such that $X$ is the topological direct sum of $M$ and $N.$ A vector subspace is called uncomplemented if it is not a complemented subspace. For example, every vector subspace of a Hausdorff TVS that is not a closed subset is necessarily uncomplemented. Every closed vector subspace of a Hilbert space is complemented. But every Banach space that is not a Hilbert space necessarily possess some uncomplemented closed vector subspace.

== Homomorphisms ==
The direct sum $\bigoplus_{i \in I} A_i$ comes equipped with a projection homomorphism $\pi_j \colon \, \bigoplus_{i \in I} A_i \to A_j$ for each j in I and a coprojection $\alpha_j \colon \, A_j \to \bigoplus_{i \in I} A_i$ for each j in I. Given another algebraic structure $B$ (with the same additional structure) and homomorphisms $g_j \colon A_j \to B$ for every j in I, there is a unique homomorphism $g \colon \, \bigoplus_{i \in I} A_i \to B$, called the sum of the g_{j}, such that $g \alpha_j =g_j$ for all j. Thus the direct sum is the coproduct in the appropriate category.

== See also ==
- Direct sum of groups
- Direct sum of permutations
- Direct sum of topological groups
- Restricted product
- Whitney sum
- Feferman–Vaught theorem
