= FK-space =

Sequence space that is Fréchet

In functional analysis and related areas of mathematics a FK-space or Fréchet coordinate space is a sequence space equipped with a topological structure such that it becomes a Fréchet space. FK-spaces with a normable topology are called BK-spaces.

There only exists one topology to turn a sequence space into a Fréchet space, namely the topology of pointwise convergence. Thus the name coordinate space because a sequence in an FK-space converges if and only if it converges for each coordinate.

FK-spaces are examples of topological vector spaces. They are important in summability theory.

== Definition ==
A FK-space is a sequence space of $X$, that is a linear subspace of vector space of all complex valued sequences, equipped with the topology of pointwise convergence.

We write the elements of $X$ as
$$\left(x_n\right)_{n \in \N}$$
with $x_n \in \Complex$.

Then sequence $\left(a_n\right)_{n \in \N}^{(k)}$ in $X$ converges to some point $\left(x_n\right)_{n \in \N}$ if it converges pointwise for each $n.$ That is
$$\lim_{k \to \infty} \left(a_n\right)_{n \in \N}^{(k)} = \left(x_n\right)_{n \in \N}$$
if for all $n \in \N,$
$$\lim_{k \to \infty} a_n^{(k)} = x_n$$

== Examples ==
The sequence space $\omega$ of all complex valued sequences is trivially an FK-space.

== Properties ==
Given an FK-space of $X$ and $\omega$ with the topology of pointwise convergence the inclusion map
$$\iota : X \to \omega$$
is a continuous function.

== FK-space constructions ==
Given a countable family of FK-spaces $\left(X_n, P_n\right)$ with $P_n$ a countable family of seminorms, we define
$$X := \bigcap_{n=1}^{\infty} X_n$$
and
$$P := \left\{p_{\vert X} : p \in P_n\right\}.$$
Then $(X,P)$ is again an FK-space.

== See also ==
- BK-space – Sequence space that is Banach − FK-spaces with a normable topology
- FK-AK space
- Sequence space – Vector space of infinite sequences
