= Sequence space =

Vector space of infinite sequences

In functional analysis and related areas of mathematics, a sequence space is a vector space whose elements are infinite sequences of real or complex numbers. Equivalently, it is a function space whose elements are functions from the natural numbers to the field $\mathbb K$ of real or complex numbers. The set of all such functions is naturally identified with the set of all possible infinite sequences with elements in $\mathbb K$, and can be turned into a vector space under the operations of pointwise addition of functions and pointwise scalar multiplication. All sequence spaces are linear subspaces of this space. Sequence spaces are typically equipped with a norm, or at least the structure of a topological vector space.

The most important sequence spaces in analysis are the $\textstyle \ell^p$ spaces, consisting of the $p$-power summable sequences, with the $p$-norm. These are special cases of $L^p$ spaces for the counting measure on the set of natural numbers. Other important classes of sequences like convergent sequences or null sequences form sequence spaces, respectively denoted $c$ and $c_0$, with the sup norm. Any sequence space can also be equipped with the topology of pointwise convergence, under which it becomes a special kind of Fréchet space called FK-space.

== Definition ==
A sequence $\textstyle x_{\bull} = (x_n)_{n \in \N}$ in a set $X$ is an $X$-valued map $x_{\bull} : \N \to X$ whose value at $n \in \N$ is denoted by $x_n$ instead of the usual parentheses notation $x(n)$.

=== Space of all sequences ===
Let $\mathbb K$ denote the field either of real or complex numbers. The set $\textstyle \mathbb{K}^\N$ of all sequences of elements of $\mathbb K$ is a vector space for componentwise addition
$$\left(x_n\right)_{n \in \N} + \left(y_n\right)_{n \in \N} = \left(x_n + y_n\right)_{n \in \N},$$
and componentwise scalar multiplication
$$\alpha\left(x_n\right)_{n \in \N} = \left(\alpha x_n\right)_{n \in \N}.$$

A sequence space is any linear subspace of $\textstyle \mathbb{K}^\N$.

As a topological space, $\textstyle \mathbb{K}^\N$ is naturally endowed with the product topology. Under this topology, $\textstyle \mathbb{K}^\N$ is Fréchet, meaning that it is a complete, metrizable, locally convex topological vector space (TVS). However, this topology is rather pathological: there are no continuous norms on $\textstyle \mathbb{K}^\N$ (and thus the product topology cannot be defined by any norm). Among Fréchet spaces, $\textstyle \mathbb{K}^\N$ is minimal in having no continuous norms:

Theorem—Let $X$ be a Fréchet space over $\mathbb K$. Then the following are equivalent:

1. $X$ admits no continuous norm (that is, any continuous seminorm on $X$ has a nontrivial null space).
2. $X$ contains a vector subspace TVS-isomorphic to $\textstyle \mathbb{K}^\N$.
3. $X$ contains a complemented vector subspace TVS-isomorphic to $\textstyle \mathbb{K}^\N$.

But the product topology is also unavoidable: $\textstyle \mathbb{K}^\N$ does not admit a strictly coarser Hausdorff, locally convex topology. For that reason, the study of sequences begins by finding a strict linear subspace of interest, and endowing it with a topology different from the subspace topology.

=== ℓ^{p} spaces ===
For $0 < p < \infty$, $\textstyle \ell^p$ is the subspace of $\textstyle \mathbb{K}^\N$ consisting of all sequences $\textstyle x_{\bull} = (x_n)_{n \in \N}$ satisfying
$$\sum_n |x_n|^p < \infty.$$

If $p \geq 1$, then the real-valued function $\|\cdot\|_p$ on $\textstyle \ell^p$ defined by
$$\|x\|_p ~=~ \Bigl(\sum_n|x_n|^p\Bigr)^{1/p} \qquad \text{ for all } x \in \ell^p$$
defines a norm on $\textstyle \ell^p$. In fact, $\textstyle \ell^p$ is a complete metric space with respect to this norm, and therefore is a Banach space.

If $p = 2$ then $\textstyle \ell^2$ is also a Hilbert space when endowed with its canonical inner product, called the Euclidean inner product, defined for all $\textstyle x_\bull, y_\bull \in \ell^p$ by
$$\langle x_\bull, y_\bull \rangle ~=~ \sum_n \overline{x_n\!}\, y_n.$$
The canonical norm induced by this inner product is the usual $\textstyle \ell^2$-norm, meaning that $\textstyle \|\mathbf{x}\|_2 = \sqrt{\langle \mathbf{x}, \mathbf{x} \rangle}$ for all $\textstyle \mathbf{x} \in \ell^p$.

If $p = \infty$, then $\textstyle \ell^\infty$ is defined to be the space of all bounded sequences endowed with the norm
$$\|x\|_\infty ~=~ \sup_n |x_n|,$$
$\textstyle \ell^\infty$ is also a Banach space.

If $0 < p < 1$, then $\textstyle \ell^p$ does not carry a norm, but rather a metric defined by
$$d(x,y) ~=~ \sum_n \left|x_n - y_n\right|^p.$$

=== c, c_{0} and c_{00} ===
A convergent sequence is any sequence $\textstyle x_{\bull} \in \mathbb{K}^\N$ such that $\textstyle \lim_{n \to \infty} x_n$ exists. The set $c$ of all convergent sequences is a vector subspace of $\textstyle \mathbb{K}^\N$ called the space of convergent sequences. Since every convergent sequence is bounded, $c$ is a linear subspace of $\ell^\infty$. Moreover, this sequence space is a closed subspace of $\textstyle \ell^\infty$ with respect to the supremum norm, and so it is a Banach space with respect to this norm.

A sequence that converges to $0$ is called a null sequence and is said to vanish. The set of all sequences that converge to $0$ is a closed vector subspace of $c$ that when endowed with the supremum norm becomes a Banach space that is denoted by $c_0$ and is called the space of null sequences or the space of vanishing sequences.

The space of eventually zero sequences, $c_{00}$, is the subspace of $c_0$ consisting of all sequences which have only finitely many nonzero elements. This is not a closed subspace and therefore is not a Banach space with respect to the infinity norm. For example, the sequence $\textstyle (x_{nk})_{k \in \N}$ where $x_{nk} = 1/k$ for the first $n$ entries (for $k = 1, \ldots, n$) and is zero everywhere else (that is, $\textstyle (x_{nk})_{k \in \N} = {}\!$$\bigl(1, \tfrac12, \ldots,{}$$\tfrac{1}{n-1}, \tfrac{1}{n}, {}$$0, 0, \ldots\bigr)$) is a Cauchy sequence but it does not converge to a sequence in $c_{00}.$

=== Space of all finite sequences ===
Let
$$\mathbb{K}^\infty=\left\{\left(x_1, x_2,\ldots\right)\in\mathbb{K}^\N : \text{all but finitely many }x_i\text{ equal }0\right\}$$

denote the space of finite sequences over $\mathbb K$. As a vector space, $\textstyle \mathbb{K}^\infty$ is equal to $c_{00}$, but $\textstyle \mathbb{K}^\infty$ has a different topology.

For every natural number $n \in \N$, let $\textstyle \mathbb{K}^n$ denote the usual Euclidean space endowed with the Euclidean topology and let $\textstyle \operatorname{In}_{\mathbb{K}^n} : \mathbb{K}^n \to \mathbb{K}^\infty$ denote the canonical inclusion
$$\operatorname{In}_{\mathbb{K}^n}\left(x_1, \ldots, x_n\right) = \left(x_1, \ldots, x_n, 0, 0, \ldots \right).$$
The image of each inclusion is
$$\operatorname{Im} \left( \operatorname{In}_{\mathbb{K}^n} \right)
= \left\{ \left(x_1, \ldots, x_n, 0, 0, \ldots \right) : x_1, \ldots, x_n \in \mathbb{K} \right\}
= \mathbb{K}^n \times \left\{ (0, 0, \ldots) \right\}$$
and consequently,
$$\mathbb{K}^\infty = \bigcup_{n \in \N} \operatorname{Im} \left( \operatorname{In}_{\mathbb{K}^n} \right).$$

This family of inclusions gives $\textstyle \mathbb{K}^\infty$ a final topology $\textstyle \tau^\infty$, defined to be the finest topology on $\textstyle \mathbb{K}^\infty$ such that all the inclusions are continuous (an example of a coherent topology). With this topology, $\textstyle \mathbb{K}^\infty$ becomes a complete, Hausdorff, locally convex, sequential, topological vector space that is not Fréchet–Urysohn. The topology $\textstyle \tau^\infty$ is also strictly finer than the subspace topology induced on $\textstyle \mathbb{K}^\infty$ by $\textstyle \mathbb{K}^\N$.

Convergence in $\textstyle \tau^\infty$ has a natural description: if $\textstyle v \in \mathbb{K}^\infty$ and $v_\bull$ is a sequence in $\textstyle \mathbb{K}^\infty$ then $v_\bull \to v$ in $\textstyle \tau^\infty$ if and only $v_\bull$ is eventually contained in a single image $\textstyle \operatorname{Im} \left( \operatorname{In}_{\mathbb{K}^n} \right)$ and $v_\bull \to v$ under the natural topology of that image.

Often, each image $\textstyle \operatorname{Im} \left( \operatorname{In}_{\mathbb{K}^n} \right)$ is identified with the corresponding $\textstyle \mathbb{K}^n$; explicitly, the elements $\textstyle \left( x_1, \ldots, x_n \right) \in \mathbb{K}^n$ and $\left( x_1, \ldots, x_n, 0, 0, 0, \ldots \right)$ are identified. This is facilitated by the fact that the subspace topology on $\textstyle \operatorname{Im} \left( \operatorname{In}_{\mathbb{K}^n} \right)$, the quotient topology from the map $\textstyle \operatorname{In}_{\mathbb{K}^n}$, and the Euclidean topology on $\textstyle \mathbb{K}^n$ all coincide. With this identification, $\textstyle \left( \left(\mathbb{K}^\infty, \tau^\infty\right), \left(\operatorname{In}_{\mathbb{K}^n}\right)_{n \in \N}\right)$ is the direct limit of the directed system $\textstyle \left( \left(\mathbb{K}^n\right)_{n \in \N}, \left(\operatorname{In}_{\mathbb{K}^m\to\mathbb{K}^n}\right)_{m \leq n\in\N},\N \right),$ where every inclusion adds trailing zeros:
$$\operatorname{In}_{\mathbb{K}^m\to\mathbb{K}^n}\left(x_1, \ldots, x_m\right) = \left(x_1, \ldots, x_m, 0, \ldots, 0 \right).$$
This shows $\textstyle \left(\mathbb{K}^\infty, \tau^\infty \right)$ is an LB-space.

=== Other sequence spaces ===
The space of bounded series, denote by bs, is the space of sequences $x$ for which
$$\sup_n \biggl\vert \sum_{i=0}^n x_i \biggr\vert < \infty.$$

This space, when equipped with the norm
$$\|x\|_{bs} = \sup_n \biggl\vert \sum_{i=0}^n x_i \biggr\vert,$$

is a Banach space isometrically isomorphic to $\textstyle \ell^\infty,$ via the linear mapping
$$(x_n)_{n \in \N} \mapsto \biggl(\sum_{i=0}^n x_i\biggr)_{n \in \N}.$$

The subspace $cs$ consisting of all convergent series is a subspace that goes over to the space $c$ under this isomorphism.

The space $\Phi$ or $c_{00}$ is defined to be the space of all infinite sequences with only a finite number of non-zero terms (sequences with finite support). This set is dense in many sequence spaces.

== Properties of ℓ^{p} spaces and the space c_{0} ==
The space $\textstyle \ell^2$ is the only $\textstyle \ell^p$ space that is a Hilbert space, since any norm that is induced by an inner product should satisfy the parallelogram law

$$\|x+y\|_p^2 + \|x-y\|_p^2= 2\|x\|_p^2 + 2\|y\|_p^2.$$

Substituting two distinct unit vectors for $x$ and $y$ directly shows that the identity is not true unless $p = 2$.

Each $\textstyle \ell^p$ is distinct, in that $\textstyle \ell^p$ is a strict subset of $\textstyle \ell^s$ whenever $p < s$; furthermore, $\textstyle \ell^p$ is not linearly isomorphic to $\textstyle \ell^s$ when $p \neq s$. In fact, by Pitt's theorem (Pitt 1936), every bounded linear operator from $\textstyle \ell^s$ to $\textstyle \ell^p$ is compact when $p < s$. No such operator can be an isomorphism; and further, it cannot be an isomorphism on any infinite-dimensional subspace of $\ell^s$, and is thus said to be strictly singular.

If $1 < p < \infty$, then the (continuous) dual space of $\textstyle \ell^p$ is isometrically isomorphic to $\textstyle \ell^q$, where $q$ is the Hölder conjugate of $p$: $1/p + 1/q = 1$. The specific isomorphism associates to an element $x$ of $\textstyle \ell^q$ the functional
$$L_x(y) = \sum_n x_n y_n$$
for $y$ in $\textstyle \ell^p$. Hölder's inequality implies that $L_x$ is a bounded linear functional on $\textstyle \ell^p$, and in fact
$$|L_x(y)| \le \|x\|_q\, \|y\|_p$$
so that the operator norm satisfies
$$\|L_x\|_{(\ell^p)^*} \mathrel{\stackrel{\rm{def}}{=}} \sup_{y\in\ell^p, y\not=0} \frac{|L_x(y)|}{\|y\|_p} \le \|x\|_q.$$
In fact, taking $y$ to be the element of $\textstyle \ell^p$ with
$$y_n = \begin{cases}
0               & \text{if}\ x_n=0 \\
x_n^{-1}|x_n|^q & \text{if}~ x_n \neq 0
\end{cases}$$
gives $L_x(y) = \|x\|_q$, so that in fact
$$\|L_x\|_{(\ell^p)^*} = \|x\|_q.$$
Conversely, given a bounded linear functional $L$ on $\textstyle \ell^p$, the sequence defined by $x_n = L(e_n)$ lies in $\textstyle \ell^q$. Thus the mapping $x\mapsto L_x$ gives an isometry
$$\kappa_q : \ell^q \to (\ell^p)^*.$$

The map
$$\ell^q\xrightarrow{\kappa_q}(\ell^p)^*\xrightarrow{(\kappa_q^*)^{-1}}(\ell^q)^{**}$$
obtained by composing $\kappa_p$ with the inverse of its transpose coincides with the canonical injection of $\textstyle \ell^q$ into its double dual. As a consequence $\textstyle \ell^q$ is a reflexive space. By abuse of notation, it is typical to identify $\textstyle \ell^q$ with the dual of $\textstyle \ell^p$: $\textstyle (\ell^p)^* = \ell^q$. Then reflexivity is understood by the sequence of identifications $\textstyle (\ell^p)^{**} = (\ell^q)^* = \ell^p$.

The space $c_0$ is defined as the space of all sequences converging to zero, with norm identical to $\|x\|_\infty$. It is a closed subspace of $\textstyle \ell^\infty$, hence a Banach space. The dual of $c_0$ is $\textstyle \ell^1$; the dual of $\textstyle \ell^1$ is $\textstyle \ell^\infty$. For the case of natural numbers index set, the $\textstyle \ell^p$ and $c_0$ are separable, with the sole exception of $\textstyle \ell^\infty$. The dual of $\textstyle \ell^\infty$ is the ba space.

The spaces $c_0$ and $\textstyle \ell^p$ (for $1 \leq p < \infty$) have a canonical unconditional Schauder basis $\{e_i : i = 1, 2, \ldots \}$, where $e_i$ is the sequence which is zero but for a $1$ in the $i$th entry.

The space ℓ^{1} has the Schur property: In ℓ^{1}, any sequence that is weakly convergent is also strongly convergent (Schur 1921). However, since the weak topology on infinite-dimensional spaces is strictly weaker than the strong topology, there are nets in ℓ^{1} that are weak convergent but not strong convergent.

The $\textstyle \ell^p$ spaces can be embedded into many Banach spaces. The question of whether every infinite-dimensional Banach space contains an isomorph of some $\textstyle \ell^p$ or of $c_0$, was answered negatively by B. S. Tsirelson's construction of Tsirelson space in 1974. The dual statement, that every separable Banach space is linearly isometric to a quotient space of $\textstyle \ell^1$, was answered in the affirmative by Banach & Mazur (1933). That is, for every separable Banach space $X$, there exists a quotient map $\textstyle Q: \ell^1 \to X$, so that $X$ is isomorphic to $\textstyle \ell^1 / \ker Q$. In general, $\operatorname{ker} Q$ is not complemented in $\textstyle \ell^1$, that is, there does not exist a subspace $Y$ of $\textstyle \ell^1$ such that $\textstyle \ell^1 = Y \oplus \ker Q$. In fact, $\textstyle \ell^1$ has uncountably many uncomplemented subspaces that are not isomorphic to one another (for example, take $\textstyle X=\ell^p$; since there are uncountably many such $X$'s, and since no $\textstyle \ell^p$ is isomorphic to any other, there are thus uncountably many ker Q's).

Except for the trivial finite-dimensional case, an unusual feature of $\textstyle \ell^q$ is that it is not polynomially reflexive.

=== ℓ^{p} spaces are increasing in p ===
For $p \in [1,\infty]$, the spaces $\textstyle \ell^p$ are increasing in $p$, with the inclusion operator being continuous: for $1 \le p < q \le \infty$, one has $\|x\|_q\le\|x\|_p$. Indeed, the inequality is homogeneous in the $x_i$, so it is sufficient to prove it under the assumption that $\|x\|_p = 1$. In this case, we need only show that $\textstyle\sum |x_i|^q \le 1$ for $q > p$. But if $\|x\|_p = 1$, then $|x_i|\le 1$ for all $i$, and then $\textstyle \sum |x_i|^q \le {}\!$$\textstyle\sum |x_i|^p = 1$.

=== ℓ^{2} is isomorphic to all separable, infinite dimensional Hilbert spaces ===
Let $H$ be a separable Hilbert space. Every orthogonal set in $H$ is at most countable (i.e. has finite dimension or $\aleph_0$). The following two items are related:

- If $H$ is infinite dimensional, then it is isomorphic to $\textstyle \ell^2$,
- If $\operatorname{dim}(H) = N$, then $H$ is isomorphic to $\textstyle \C^N$.

== Properties of ℓ^{1} spaces ==
A sequence of elements in $\textstyle \ell^1$ converges in the space of complex sequences $\textstyle \ell^1$ if and only if it converges weakly in this space. If $K$ is a subset of this space, then the following are equivalent:

1. $K$ is compact;
2. $K$ is weakly compact;
3. $K$ is bounded, closed, and equismall at infinity.

Here $K$ being equismall at infinity means that for every $\varepsilon > 0$, there exists a natural number $n_{\varepsilon} \geq 0$ such that $\textstyle \sum_{n = n_{\epsilon}}^\infty | s_n | < \varepsilon$ for all $\textstyle s = \left( s_n \right)_{n=1}^\infty \in K$.

== See also ==
- L^{p} space
- Tsirelson space
- beta-dual space
- Orlicz sequence space
- Hilbert space

== Bibliography ==
- Banach, Stefan; Mazur, S. (1933), "Zur Theorie der linearen Dimension", Studia Mathematica, 4: 100–112, doi:10.4064/sm-4-1-100-112.
- Dunford, Nelson; Schwartz, Jacob T. (1958), Linear operators, volume I, Wiley-Interscience.
- Jarchow, Hans (1981). Locally convex spaces. Stuttgart: B.G. Teubner. ISBN 978-3-519-02224-4. OCLC 8210342.
- Pitt, H.R. (1936), "A note on bilinear forms", J. London Math. Soc., 11 (3): 174–180, doi:10.1112/jlms/s1-11.3.174.
- Narici, Lawrence; Beckenstein, Edward (2011). Topological Vector Spaces. Pure and applied mathematics (Second ed.). Boca Raton, FL: CRC Press. ISBN 978-1584888666. OCLC 144216834.
- Schaefer, Helmut H.; Wolff, Manfred P. (1999). Topological Vector Spaces. GTM. Vol. 8 (Second ed.). New York, NY: Springer New York Imprint Springer. ISBN 978-1-4612-7155-0. OCLC 840278135.
- Schur, J. (1921), "Über lineare Transformationen in der Theorie der unendlichen Reihen", Journal für die reine und angewandte Mathematik, 151: 79–111, doi:10.1515/crll.1921.151.79.
- Trèves, François (2006) [1967]. Topological Vector Spaces, Distributions and Kernels. Mineola, N.Y.: Dover Publications. ISBN 978-0-486-45352-1. OCLC 853623322.
