= Uniform norm =

Function in mathematical analysis

The perimeter of the square is the set of points in ℝ^{2} where the sup norm equals a fixed positive constant. For example, points (2, 0), (2, 1), and (2, 2) lie along the perimeter of a square and belong to the set of vectors whose sup norm is 2.

In mathematical analysis, the uniform norm (or sup norm) assigns, to real- or complex-valued bounded functions $f$ defined on a set $S$, the non-negative number

$$\|f\|_\infty = \|f\|_{\infty,S} = \sup\left\{\,|f(s)| : s \in S\,\right\}.$$

This norm is also called the supremum norm, the Chebyshev norm, the infinity norm, or, when the supremum is in fact the maximum, the max norm. The name "uniform norm" derives from the fact that a sequence of functions $\left\{f_n\right\}$ converges to $f$ under the metric derived from the uniform norm if and only if $f_n$ converges to $f$ uniformly.

If $f$ is a continuous function on a closed and bounded interval, or more generally a compact set, then it is bounded and the supremum in the above definition is attained by the Weierstrass extreme value theorem, so we can replace the supremum by the maximum. In this case, the norm is also called the maximum norm. In particular, if $x$ is some vector such that $x = \left(x_1, x_2, \ldots, x_n\right)$ in finite dimensional coordinate space, it takes the form:

$$\|x\|_\infty := \max \left(\left|x_1\right| , \ldots , \left|x_n\right|\right).$$

This is called the $\ell^\infty$-norm.

== Definition ==
Uniform norms are defined, in general, for bounded functions valued in a normed space. Let $X$ be a set and let $(Y,\|\|_Y)$ be a normed space. On the set $Y^X$ of functions from $X$ to $Y$, there is an extended norm defined by

$$\|f\|=\sup_{x\in X}\|f(x)\|_Y\in[0,\infty].$$

This is in general an extended norm since the function $f$ may not be bounded. Restricting this extended norm to the bounded functions (i.e., the functions with finite above extended norm) yields a (finite-valued) norm, called the uniform norm on $Y^X$. Note that the definition of uniform norm does not rely on any additional structure on the set $X$, although in practice $X$ is often at least a topological space.

The convergence on $Y^X$ in the topology induced by the uniform extended norm is the uniform convergence, for sequences, and also for nets and filters on $Y^X$.

We can define closed sets and closures of sets with respect to this metric topology; closed sets in the uniform norm are sometimes called uniformly closed and closures uniform closures. The uniform closure of a set of functions A is the space of all functions that can be approximated by a sequence of uniformly-converging functions on $A.$ For instance, one restatement of the Stone–Weierstrass theorem is that the set of all continuous functions on $[a,b]$ is the uniform closure of the set of polynomials on $[a, b].$

For complex continuous functions over a compact space, this turns it into a C* algebra (cf. Gelfand representation).

== Weaker structures inducing the topology of uniform convergence ==
=== Uniform metric ===
The uniform metric between two bounded functions $f,g\colon X\to Y$ from a set $X$ to a metric space $(Y,d_Y)$ is defined by

$$d(f,g)=\sup_{x\in X}d_Y(f(x),g(x))$$

The uniform metric is also called the Chebyshev metric, after Pafnuty Chebyshev, who was first to systematically study it. In this case, $f$ is bounded precisely if $d(f,g)$ is finite for some constant function $g$. If we allow unbounded functions, this formula does not yield a norm or metric in a strict sense, although the obtained so-called extended metric still allows one to define a topology on the function space in question; the convergence is then still the uniform convergence. In particular, a sequence $\left\{f_n : n = 1, 2, 3, \ldots\right\}$ converges uniformly to a function $f$ if and only if $\lim_{n\rightarrow\infty}d(f_n,f)= 0.\,$

If $(Y,\|\|_Y)$ is a normed space, then it is a metric space in a natural way. The extended metric on $Y^X$ induced by the uniform extended norm is the same as the uniform extended metric

$$d(f,g)=\sup_{x\in X}\|f(x)-g(x)\|_Y$$

on $Y^X$

=== Uniformity of uniform convergence ===
Let $X$ be a set and let $(Y,\mathcal E_Y)$ be a uniform space. A sequence $(f_n)$ of functions from $X$ to $Y$ is said to converge uniformly to a function $f$ if for each entourage $E\in\mathcal E_Y$ there is a natural number $n_0$ such that, $(f_n(x),f(x))$ belongs to $E$ whenever $x\in X$ and $n\ge n_0$. Similarly for a net. This is a convergence in a topology on $Y^X$. In fact, the sets

$$\{(f,g)\colon\forall x\in X\colon(f(x),g(x))\in E\}$$

where $E$ runs through entourages of $Y$ form a fundamental system of entourages of a uniformity on $Y^X$, called the uniformity of uniform convergence on $Y^X$. The uniform convergence is precisely the convergence under its uniform topology.

If $(Y,d_Y)$ is a metric space, then it is by default equipped with the metric uniformity. The metric uniformity on $Y^X$ with respect to the uniform extended metric is then the uniformity of uniform convergence on $Y^X$.

== Properties ==
The set of vectors whose infinity norm is a given constant, $c,$ forms the surface of a hypercube with edge length $2 c.$

The reason for the subscript “$\infty$” is that whenever $f$ is continuous and $\Vert f \Vert_p < \infty$ for some $p \in (0, \infty)$, then $\lim_{p \to \infty}\|f\|_p = \|f\|_\infty,$ where $\|f\|_p = \left(\int_D |f|^p\,d\mu\right)^{1/p}$ where $D$ is the domain of $f$; the integral amounts to a sum if $D$ is a discrete set (see p-norm).

== See also ==
- L-infinity – Space of bounded sequences
- Uniform continuity – Uniform restraint of the change in functions
- Uniform space – Topological space with a notion of uniform properties
- Chebyshev distance – Mathematical metric
