= Co- and contravariant model structure =

In higher category theory in mathematics, co- and contravariant model structures are special model structures on slice categories of the category of simplicial sets. On them, postcomposition and pullbacks (due to its application in algebraic geometry also known as base change) induce adjoint functors, which with the model structures can even become Quillen adjunctions.

== Definition ==
Let $A$ be a simplicial set, then there is a slice category $\mathbf{sSet}/A$. With the choice of a model structure on $\mathbf{sSet}$, for example the Joyal or Kan–Quillen model structure, it induces a model structure on $\mathbf{sSet}/A$.

- Covariant cofibrations are monomorphisms. Covariant fibrant objects are the left fibrant objects over $A$. Covariant fibrations between two such left fibrant objects over $A$ are exactly the left fibrations.
- Contravariant cofibrations are monomorphisms. Contravariant fibrant objects are the right fibrant objects over $A$. Contravariant fibrations between two such right fibrant objects over $A$ are exactly the right fibrations.

The slice category $\mathbf{sSet}/A$ with the co- and contravariant model structure is denoted $(\mathbf{sSet}/A)_\mathrm{cov}$ and $(\mathbf{sSet}/A)_\mathrm{cont}$ respectively.

== Properties ==
- The covariant model structure is left proper and combinatorical.

== Homotopy categories ==
For any model category, there is a homotopy category associated to it by formally inverting all weak equivalences. In homotopical algebra, the co- and contravariant model structures of the Kan–Quillen model structure with weak homotopy equivalences as weak equivalences are of particular interest. For a simplicial set $A$, let:

$$\operatorname{LFib}(A)
:=\operatorname{Ho}((\mathbf{sSet}_\mathrm{KQ}/A)_\mathrm{cov})$$
$$\operatorname{RFib}(A)
:=\operatorname{Ho}((\mathbf{sSet}_\mathrm{KQ}/A)_\mathrm{cont})$$

Since $\Delta^0$ is the terminal object of $\mathbf{sSet}$, one in particular has:

$$\operatorname{Ho}(\mathbf{sSet}_\mathrm{KQ})
=\operatorname{LFib}(\Delta^0)
=\operatorname{RFib}(\Delta^0).$$

Since the functor of the opposite simplicial set is a Quillen equivalence between the co- and contravariant model structure, one has:

$$\operatorname{LFib}(A^\mathrm{op})
=\operatorname{RFib}(A).$$

== Quillen adjunctions ==
Let $p\colon A\rightarrow B$ be a morphism of simplicial sets, then there is a functor $p_!\colon \mathbf{sSet}/A\rightarrow\mathbf{sSet}/B$ by postcomposition and a functor $p^*\colon \mathbf{sSet}/B\rightarrow\mathbf{sSet}/A$ by pullback with an adjunction $p_!\dashv p^*$. Since the latter commutes with all colimits, it also has a right adjoint $p_*\colon \mathbf{sSet}/A\rightarrow\mathbf{sSet}/B$ with $p^*\dashv p_*$. For the contravariant model structure (of the Kan–Quillen model structure), the former adjunction is always a Quillen adjunction, while the latter is for $p$ proper. This results in derived adjunctions:

$$\mathbf{L}p_!\colon\operatorname{RFib}(A)\rightleftarrows\operatorname{RFib}(B)\colon\mathbf{R}p^*,$$
$$\mathbf{L}p^*\colon\operatorname{RFib}(B)\rightleftarrows\operatorname{RFib}(A)\colon\mathbf{R}p_*.$$

== Properties ==
- For a functor of ∞-categories $p\colon A\rightarrow B$ , the following conditions are equivalent:
  - $p\colon A\rightarrow B$ is fully faithful.
  - $\mathbf{L}p_!\colon \operatorname{LFib}(A)\rightarrow\operatorname{LFib}(B)$ is fully faithful.
  - $\mathbf{L}p_!\colon \operatorname{RFib}(A)\rightarrow\operatorname{RFib}(B)$ is fully faithful.
- For an essential surjective functor of ∞-categories $p\colon A\rightarrow B$ , the functor $\mathbf{R}p^*\colon \operatorname{RFib}(B)\rightarrow\operatorname{RFib}(A)$ is conservative.
- Every equivalence of ∞-categories $p\colon A\rightarrow B$ induces equivalence of categories:
  $$\mathbf{L}p_!\colon
\operatorname{LFib}(A)\rightleftarrows\operatorname{LFib}(B),$$
  $$\mathbf{L}p_!\colon
\operatorname{RFib}(A)\rightleftarrows\operatorname{RFib}(B),$$
- All inner horn inclusions $i\colon \Lambda_k^n\hookrightarrow\Delta^n$ (with $n\geq 2$ and $0<k<n$) induce an equivalence of categories:
  $$\mathbf{L}i_!\colon\operatorname{RFib}(\Lambda_k^n)\rightarrow\operatorname{RFib}(\Delta^n).$$

== See also ==
- Injective and projective model structure, induced model structures on functor categories

== Literature ==
- Lurie, Jacob (2009). Higher Topos Theory. Annals of Mathematics Studies. Vol. 170. Princeton University Press. arXiv:math.CT/0608040. ISBN 978-0-691-14049-0. MR 2522659.
- Cisinski, Denis-Charles (2019-06-30). Higher Categories and Homotopical Algebra (PDF). Cambridge University Press. ISBN 978-1108473200.
