= Join (simplicial sets) =

Construction for categories

In higher category theory in mathematics, the join of simplicial sets is an operation making the category of simplicial sets into a monoidal category. In particular, it takes two simplicial sets to construct another simplicial set. It is closely related to the diamond operation and used in the construction of the twisted diagonal. Under the nerve construction, it corresponds to the join of categories and under the geometric realization, it corresponds to the join of topological spaces.

== Definition ==
Visualization of the join $X*Y$ with the blue part representing $X$ and the green part representing $Y$.

For natural numbers $m,p,q\in\mathbb{N}$, one has the identity:

$$\operatorname{Hom}([m],[p+q+1])
=\prod_{i+j+1=m}\operatorname{Hom}([i],[p])\times\operatorname{Hom}([j],[q]),$$

which can be extended by colimits to a functor $-*-\colon \mathbf{sSet}\times\mathbf{sSet}\rightarrow \mathbf{sSet}$, which together with the empty simplicial set as unit element makes the category of simplicial sets $\mathbf{sSet}$ into a monoidal category. For simplicial set $X$ and $Y$, their join $X*Y$ is the simplicial set:

$$(X*Y)_n
=\prod_{i+j+1=n}X_i\times Y_j.$$

A $n$-simplex $\sigma\colon \Delta^n\rightarrow X*Y$ therefore either factors over $X$ or $Y$ or splits into a $p$-simplex $\sigma_-\colon \Delta^p\rightarrow X$ and a $q$-simplex $\sigma_+\colon \Delta^q\rightarrow Y$ with $n=p+q+1$ and $\sigma=\sigma_-*\sigma_+$.

One has canonical morphisms $X,Y\rightarrow X*Y$, which combine into a canonical morphism $X+Y\rightarrow X*Y$ through the universal property of the coproduct. One also has a canonical morphism $X*Y\rightarrow\Delta^0*\Delta^0 \cong\Delta^1$ of terminal maps, for which the fiber of $0$ is $X$ and the fiber of $1$ is $Y$.

For a simplicial set $X$, one further defines its left cone and right cone as:

$$X^\triangleleft
:=\Delta^0*X,$$
$$X^\triangleright
:=X*\Delta^0.$$

== Right adjoint ==
Let $Y$ be a simplicial set. The functor $Y*-\colon \mathbf{sSet}\rightarrow Y\backslash\mathbf{sSet}, X\mapsto(Y\mapsto Y*X)$ has a right adjoint $Y\backslash\mathbf{sSet}\rightarrow\mathbf{sSet}, (t\colon Y\rightarrow W)\mapsto t\backslash W$ (alternatively denoted $Y\backslash W$) and the functor $-*Y\colon \mathbf{sSet}\rightarrow Y\backslash\mathbf{sSet}, X\mapsto(Y\mapsto X*Y)$ also has a right adjoint $Y\backslash\mathbf{sSet}\rightarrow\mathbf{sSet}, (t\colon Y\rightarrow W)\mapsto W/t$ (alternatively denoted $W/Y$). A special case is $Y=\Delta^0$ the terminal simplicial set, since $\mathbf{sSet}_* =\Delta^0\backslash\mathbf{sSet}$ is the category of pointed simplicial sets.

Let $\mathcal{C}$ be a category and $X\in\operatorname{Ob}\mathcal{C}$ be an object. Let $[0]$ be the terminal category (with the notation taken from the terminal object of the simplex category), then there is an associated functor $t\colon [0]\rightarrow\mathcal{C}, 0\mapsto X$, which with the nerve induces a morphism $Nt\colon \Delta^0\rightarrow N\mathcal{C}$. For every simplicial set $A$, one has by additionally using the adjunction between the join of categories and slice categories:

$$\begin{align}
\mathbf{sSet}(A,N\mathcal{C}/Nt)
&\cong\mathbf{sSet}_*(\Delta^0\rightarrow A*\Delta^0,Nt)
\cong\mathbf{Cat}_*([0]\rightarrow\tau(A)\star[0],t) \\
&\cong\mathbf{Cat}(\tau(A),\mathcal{C}/X)
\cong\mathbf{sSet}(A,N(\mathcal{C}/X)).
\end{align}$$

Hence according to the Yoneda lemma, one has (with the alternative notation, which here better underlines the result):

$$N\mathcal{C}/NX
\cong N(\mathcal{C}/X).$$

== Examples ==
One has:

$$\partial\Delta^m*\Delta^n\cup\Delta^m*\partial\Delta^n
\cong\partial\Delta^{m+n+1},$$
$$\Lambda_k^m*\Delta^n\cup\Delta^m*\partial\Delta^n
\cong\Lambda_k^{m+n+1},$$
$$\partial\Delta^m*\Delta^n\cup\Delta^m*\Lambda_k^n
\cong\Lambda_{m+k+1}^{m+n+1}.$$

== Properties ==
- For simplicial sets $X$ and $Y$, there is a unique morphism $\gamma_{X,Y}\colon X\diamond Y\rightarrow X*Y$ into the diamond operation compatible with the maps $X+Y\rightarrow X*Y,X\diamond Y$ and $X*Y,X\diamond Y\rightarrow\Delta^1$. It is a weak categorical equivalence, hence a weak equivalence of the Joyal model structure.
- For a simplicial set $X$, the functors $X*-,-*X\colon\mathbf{sSet}\rightarrow\mathbf{sSet}$ preserve weak categorical equivalences.
- For ∞-categories $X$ and $Y$, the simplicial set $X*Y$ is also an ∞-category.
- The join is associative. For simplicial sets $X$, $Y$ and $Z$, one has:
  $$(X*Y)*Z
\cong X*(Y*Z).$$
- The join reverses under the opposite simplicial set. For simplicial sets $X$ and $Y$, one has:
  $$(X*Y)^\mathrm{op}
\cong Y^\mathrm{op}*X^\mathrm{op}.$$
- For a morphism $t\colon Y\rightarrow W$, one has (as adjoint of the previous result):
  $$(W/t)^\mathrm{op}
\cong t^\mathrm{op}\backslash W^\mathrm{op}.$$
- For a morphism $z\colon Y*X\rightarrow W$, its precomposition with the canonical inclusion $x\colon X\rightarrow Y*X\rightarrow W$ and $y\colon Y\rightarrow W/x$ corresponding to $z$ under the adjunction $\mathbf{sSet}(Y,W/x)\cong X\backslash\mathbf{sSet}(X\rightarrow Y*X,x)$, one has $W/z\cong(W/x)/y$ or in alternative notation:

$$W/(Y*X)
\cong(W/X)/Y.$$

Proof: For every simplicial set $A$, one has:

$$\begin{align}
\mathbf{sSet}(A,W/z)
&\cong(Y*X)\backslash\mathbf{sSet}((Y*X)\rightarrow A*(Y*X),z)
\cong X\backslash\mathbf{sSet}(X\rightarrow(A*Y)*X,x) \\
&\cong\mathbf{sSet}(A*Y,W/x)
\cong Y\backslash\mathbf{sSet}(Y\rightarrow A*Y,y)
\cong\mathbf{sSet}(A,(W/x)/y),
\end{align}$$

so the claim follows from the Yoneda lemma.

- Under the nerve, the join of categories becomes the join of simplicial sets. For small categories $\mathcal{C}$ and $\mathcal{D}$, one has:
  $$N(\mathcal{C}\star\mathcal{D})
\cong N\mathcal{C}*N\mathcal{D}.$$

== Literature ==
- Joyal, André (2008). "The Theory of Quasi-Categories and its Applications" (PDF).
- Lurie, Jacob (2009). Higher Topos Theory. Annals of Mathematics Studies. Vol. 170. Princeton University Press. arXiv:math.CT/0608040. ISBN 978-0-691-14049-0. MR 2522659.
- Cisinski, Denis-Charles (2019-06-30). Higher Categories and Homotopical Algebra (PDF). Cambridge University Press. ISBN 978-1108473200.
