= Kan–Quillen model structure =

Model structure on the category of simplicial sets

In higher category theory, the Kan–Quillen model structure is a special model structure on the category of simplicial sets. It consists of three classes of morphisms between simplicial sets called fibrations, cofibrations and weak equivalences, which fulfill the properties of a model structure. Its fibrant objects are all Kan complexes and it furthermore models the homotopy theory of CW complexes up to weak homotopy equivalence, with the correspondence between simplicial sets, Kan complexes and CW complexes being given by the geometric realization and the singular functor (Milnor's theorem). The Kan–Quillen model structure is named after Daniel Kan and Daniel Quillen.

== Definition ==
The Kan–Quillen model structure is given by:

- Fibrations are Kan fibrations.
- Cofibrations are monomorphisms.
- Weak equivalences are weak homotopy equivalences, hence morphisms between simplicial sets, whose geometric realization is a weak homotopy equivalence between CW complexes.
- Trivial cofibrations are anodyne extensions.

The category of simplicial sets $\mathbf{sSet}$ with the Kan–Quillen model structure is denoted $\mathbf{sSet}_\mathrm{KQ}$.

== Properties ==
- Fiberant objects of the Kan–Quillen model structure, hence simplicial sets $X$, for which the terminal morphism $X\xrightarrow{!}\Delta^0$ is a fibration, are the Kan complexes.
- Cofiberant objects of the Kan–Quillen model structure, hence simplicial sets $X$, for which the initial morphism $\emptyset\xrightarrow{!}X$ is a cofibration, are all simplicial sets.
- The Kan–Quillen model structure is proper. This means that weak homotopy equivalences are both preversed by pullback along its fibrations (Kan fibrations) as well as pushout along its cofibrations (monomorphisms). Left properness follows directly since all objects are cofibrant.
- The Kan–Quillen model structure is a Cisinski model structure and in particular cofibrantly generated. Cofibrations (monomorphisms) are generated by the boundary inclusions $\partial\Delta^n\hookrightarrow\Delta^n$ and acyclic cofibrations (anodyne extensions) are generated by horn inclusions $\Lambda_k^n\hookrightarrow\Delta^n$(with $n\geq 2$ and $0\leq k\leq n$).
- Weak homotopy equivalences are closed under finite products.
- Since the Joyal model structure also has monomorphisms as cofibrations and every weak homotopy equivalence is a weak categorical equivalence, the identity $\operatorname{Id}\colon \mathbf{sSet}_\mathrm{KQ}\rightarrow\mathbf{sSet}_\mathrm{J}$ preserves both cofibrations and acyclic cofibrations, hence as a left adjoint with the identity $\operatorname{Id}\colon \mathbf{sSet}_\mathrm{J}\rightarrow\mathbf{sSet}_\mathrm{KQ}$ as right adjoint forms a Quillen adjunction.

== Local weak homotopy equivalence ==
For a simplicial set $B$ and a morphism of simplicial sets $f\colon X\rightarrow Y$ over $B$ (so that there are morphisms $p\colon X\rightarrow B$ and $q\colon Y\rightarrow B$ with $p=q\circ f$), the following conditions are equivalent:

- For every $n$-simplex $\sigma\colon\Delta^n\rightarrow B$, the induced map $\Delta^n\times_B\sigma\colon \Delta^n\times_BX\rightarrow\Delta^n\times_BY$ is a weak homotopy equivalence.
- For every morphism $g\colon A\rightarrow B$, the induced map $A\times_Bg\colon A\times_BX\rightarrow A\times_BY$ is a weak homotopy equivalence.

Such a morphism is called a local weak homotopy equivalence.

- Every local weak homotopy equivalence is a weak homotopy equivalence.
- If both morphisms $p$ and $q$ are Kan fibrations and $f$ is a weak homotopy equivalence, then it is a local weak homotopy equivalence.

== See also ==
- Ex∞ functor, which preserves all three classes of the Kan–Quillen model structure
- Co- and contravariant model structure, which can be induced by the Kan–Quillen model structure

== Literature ==
- Quillen, Daniel (1967). Homotopical Algebra. Springer Nature. doi:10.1007/BFb0097438. ISBN 978-3-540-03914-3.
- Joyal, André (2008). "The Theory of Quasi-Categories and its Applications" (PDF).
- Lurie, Jacob (2009). Higher Topos Theory. Annals of Mathematics Studies. Vol. 170. Princeton University Press. arXiv:math.CT/0608040. ISBN 978-0-691-14049-0. MR 2522659.
- Cisinski, Denis-Charles (2019-06-30). Higher Categories and Homotopical Algebra (PDF). Cambridge University Press. ISBN 978-1108473200.
