= Twisted diagonal (simplicial sets) =

Construction for simplicial sets

In higher category theory in mathematics, the twisted diagonal of a simplicial set (for ∞-categories also called the twisted arrow ∞-category) is a construction, which generalizes the twisted diagonal of a category to which it corresponds under the nerve construction. Since the twisted diagonal of a category is the category of elements of the Hom functor, the twisted diagonal of an ∞-category can be used to define the Hom functor of an ∞-category.

== Twisted diagonal with the join operation ==
For a simplicial set $A$ define a bisimplicial set and a simplicial set with the opposite simplicial set and the join of simplicial sets by:

$$\mathbf{Tw}(A)_{m,n}
=\operatorname{Hom}((\Delta^m)^\mathrm{op}*\Delta^n,A),$$
$$\operatorname{Tw}(A)
=\delta^*(\mathbf{Tw}(A)).$$

($\delta^*\colon \mathbf{bisSet}\rightarrow\mathbf{sSet}$ is the functor obtained by precomposition with the diagonal $\delta\colon\Delta\rightarrow\Delta\times\Delta$, hence $\delta^*(A)_n=A_{n,n}$.) The canonical morphisms $(\Delta^m)^\mathrm{op}\rightarrow(\Delta^m)^\mathrm{op}*\Delta^n\leftarrow\Delta^n$ induce canonical morphisms $\mathbf{Tw}(A)\rightarrow A^\mathrm{op}\boxtimes A$ and $\operatorname{Tw}(A)\rightarrow A^\mathrm{op}\times A$.

== Twisted diagonal with the diamond operation ==
For a simplicial set $A$ define a bisimplicial set and a simplicial set with the opposite simplicial set and the diamond operation by:

$$\mathbf{Tw}_\diamond(A)_{m,n}
=\operatorname{Hom}((\Delta^m)^\mathrm{op}\diamond\Delta^n,A),$$
$$\operatorname{Tw}_\diamond(A)
=\delta^*(\mathbf{Tw}_\diamond(A)).$$

The canonical morphisms $(\Delta^m)^\mathrm{op}\rightarrow(\Delta^m)^\mathrm{op}\diamond\Delta^n\leftarrow\Delta^n$ induce canonical morphisms $\mathbf{Tw}_\diamond(A)\rightarrow A^\mathrm{op}\boxtimes A$ and $\operatorname{Tw}_\diamond(A)\rightarrow A^\mathrm{op}\times A$. The weak categorical equivalence $\gamma_{(\Delta^m)^\mathrm{op},\Delta^n}\colon (\Delta^m)^\mathrm{op}\diamond\Delta^n\rightarrow(\Delta^m)^\mathrm{op}*\Delta^n$ induces canonical morphisms $\mathbf{Tw}(A)\rightarrow\mathbf{Tw}_\diamond(A)$ and $\operatorname{Tw}(A)\rightarrow\operatorname{Tw}_\diamond(A)$.

== Properties ==
- Under the nerve, the twisted diagonal of categories corresponds to the twisted diagonal of simplicial sets. Let $\mathcal{C}$ be a small category, then:
  $$N\operatorname{Tw}(\mathcal{C})
=\operatorname{Tw}(N\mathcal{C}).$$
- For an ∞-category $A$, the canonical map $\operatorname{Tw}(A)\rightarrow A^\mathrm{op}\times A$ is a left fibration. Therefore, the twisted diagonal $\operatorname{Tw}(A)$ is also an ∞-category.
- For a Kan complex $A$, the canonical map $\operatorname{Tw}(A)\rightarrow A^\mathrm{op}\times A$ is a Kan fibration. Therefore, the twisted diagonal $\operatorname{Tw}(A)$ is also a Kan complex.
- For an ∞-category $A$, the canonical map $\mathbf{Tw}_\diamond(A)\rightarrow A^\mathrm{op}\boxtimes A$ is a left bifibration and the canonical map $\operatorname{Tw}_\diamond(A)\rightarrow A^\mathrm{op}\times A$ is a left fibration. Therefore, the simplicial set $\operatorname{Tw}_\diamond(A)$ is also an ∞-category.
- For an ∞-category $A$, the canonical morphism $\operatorname{Tw}(A)\rightarrow\operatorname{Tw}_\diamond(A)$ is a fiberwise equivalence of left fibrations over $A^\mathrm{op}\times A$.
- A functor $u\colon A\rightarrow B$ between ∞-categories $A$ and $B$ is fully faithful if and only if the induced map:
  $$\operatorname{Tw}(A)\rightarrow(A^\mathrm{op}\times A)\times_{B^\mathrm{op}\times B}\operatorname{Tw}(B)$$

is a fiberwise equivalence over $A^\mathrm{op}\times A$.

- For a functor $u\colon A\rightarrow B$ between ∞-categories $A$ and $B$, the induced maps:
  $$\operatorname{Tw}(A)\rightarrow(A^\mathrm{op}\times B)\times_{B^\mathrm{op}\times B}\operatorname{Tw}(B),$$
  $$\operatorname{Tw}(A)\rightarrow(B^\mathrm{op}\times A)\times_{B^\mathrm{op}\times B}\operatorname{Tw}(B),$$

are cofinal.

== Literature ==
- Cisinski, Denis-Charles (2019-06-30). Higher Categories and Homotopical Algebra (PDF). Cambridge University Press. ISBN 978-1108473200.
- Lurie, Jacob. "Higher Algebra" (PDF). - 5.2.1 Twisted Arrow ∞-Categories
