= Subdivision (simplicial set) =

Endofunctor on the category of simplicial sets

Process of subdivision of the standard $2$-simplex $\Delta^2$: The partially ordered set $[2]=\{0,1,2\}$ with $0\leq 1$, $1\leq 2$ and $0\leq 2$ forms a triangle, while the partially ordered set $s([2])=\{\{0\},\{1\},\{2\},\{0,1\},\{1,2\},\{0,2\},\{0,1,2\}\}$ forms its subdivision with $\{0\}$, $\{1\}$ and $\{2\}$ being the original triangle, $\{0,1\}$, $\{1,2\}$ and $\{0,2\}$ subdividing the edges and $\{0,1,2\}$ subdividing the face.

In higher category theory in mathematics, the subdivision of simplicial sets (subdivision functor or Sd functor) is an endofunctor on the category of simplicial sets. It refines the structure of simplicial sets in a purely combinatorical way without changing constructions like the geometric realization. Furthermore, the subdivision of simplicial sets plays an important role in the extension of simplicial sets right adjoint to it.

== Definition ==
For a partially ordered set $I$, let $s(I)$ be the set of non-empty finite totally ordered subsets, which itself is partially ordered by inclusion. Every partially ordered set can be considered as a category. Postcomposition with the nerve $N\colon \mathbf{Cat}\rightarrow\mathbf{sSet}$ defines the subdivision functor $\operatorname{Sd}\colon \Delta\rightarrow\mathbf{sSet}$ on the simplex category by:

$$\operatorname{Sd}(\Delta^n)
:=N(s([n])).$$

On the full category of simplicial sets, the subdivision functor $\operatorname{Sd}\colon \mathbf{sSet}\rightarrow\mathbf{sSet}$, similar to the geometric realization, is defined through an extension by colimits. For a simplicial set $X$, one therefore has:

$$\operatorname{Sd}(X)
:=\varinjlim_{\Delta^n\rightarrow X}\operatorname{Sd}(\Delta^n).$$

With the maximum $\max\colon s(I)\rightarrow I$, which in partially ordered sets neither has to exist nor has to be unique, which both holds in totally ordered sets, there is a natural transformation $a\colon \operatorname{Sd}\Rightarrow\operatorname{Id}$ by extension. In particular there is a canonical morphism $a_X\colon \operatorname{Sd}(X)\rightarrow X$ for every simplicial set $X$.

== Sd∞ functor ==
For a simplicial set $X$, the canonical morphism $a_X\colon \operatorname{Sd}(X) \rightarrow X$ indudes an $\mathbb{N}$-shaped cocone $\ldots\rightarrow\operatorname{Sd}^3(X)\rightarrow\operatorname{Sd}^2(X)\rightarrow\operatorname{Sd}(X)\rightarrow X$, whose colimit is denoted:

$$\operatorname{Sd}^\infty(X)
:=\varprojlim_{n\in\mathbb{N}}\operatorname{Sd}^n(X).$$

Since limit and colimit are switched, there is no adjunction $\operatorname{Sd}^\infty\dashv\operatorname{Ex}^\infty$ with the Ex∞ functor.

The natural transformation $a\colon\operatorname{Sd}\Rightarrow\operatorname{Id}$ induces a natural transformation $\alpha\colon \operatorname{Sd}^\infty\Rightarrow\operatorname{Id}$. In particular, there is a canonical morphism $\alpha_X\colon \operatorname{Sd}^\infty(X)\rightarrow X$ for every simplicial set $X$.

== Examples ==
Directly from the definition, one has:

$$\operatorname{Sd}(\Delta^0)
=\Delta^0,$$
$$\operatorname{Sd}(\Delta^1)
=\Lambda_2^2.$$

Since $\partial\Delta^1 \cong\Delta^0+\Delta^0$, it is fixed under (infinite) subdivision:

$$\operatorname{Sd}(\partial\Delta^1)
=\partial\Delta^1,$$
$$\operatorname{Sd}^\infty(\partial\Delta^1)
=\partial\Delta^1.$$

== Properties ==
- For every simplicial set $X$, the canonical morphism $a_X\colon \operatorname{Sd}(X)\rightarrow X$ is a weak homotopy equivalence.
- The subdivision functor $\operatorname{Sd}$ preserves monomorphisms and weak homotopy equivalences (which follows directly from the preceding property and their 2-of-3 property) as well as anodyne extensions in combination, hence cofibrations and trivial cofibrations of the Kan–Quillen model structure. This makes the adjunction $\operatorname{Sd}\dashv\operatorname{Ex}$ even into a Quillen adjunction $\operatorname{Sd}\colon \mathbf{sSet}_\mathrm{KQ}\rightleftarrows\mathbf{sSet}_\mathrm{KQ}\colon \operatorname{Ex}$.
- For a partially ordered set $I$, one has with the nerve:
  $$\operatorname{Sd}(N(I))
\cong N(s(I)).$$

Using $I=[n]$ with $\Delta^n=N([n])$ results in the definition again.

- Let $\Phi_k^n$ be the set of non-empty subsets of $[n]$, which don't contain the complement of $\{k\}$, and let $\partial\Phi^n$ be the set of non-empty proper subsets of $[n]$, then:
  $$\operatorname{Sd}(\Lambda_k^n)
\cong N(\Phi_k^n),$$
  $$\operatorname{Sd}(\partial\Delta^n)
\cong N(\partial\Phi^n).$$
- The subdivision functor preserves the geometric realization. For a simplicial set $X$, one has:
  $$|\operatorname{Sd}(X)|
\cong|X|.$$

Since both functors are defined through extension by colimits, it is sufficient to show $|\operatorname{Sd}(\Delta^n)| =|\Delta^n|$.

== See also ==
- Subdivision (simplicial complex)

== Literature ==
- Goerss, Paul; Jardine, John Frederick (1999). Simplicial homotopy theory. Modern Birkhäuser Classics. doi:10.1007/978-3-0346-0189-4. Archived from the original on 1999-02-08.
- Cisinski, Denis-Charles (2019-06-30). Higher Categories and Homotopical Algebra (PDF). Cambridge University Press. ISBN 978-1108473200.
