= Bisimplicial set =

Simplicial object in the category of simplicial sets

In higher category theory in mathematics, a bisimplicial set is a simplicial object in the category of simplicial sets, which themselves are simplicial objects in the category of sets. Many concepts from homotopical algebra, which studies simplicial sets, can be transported over to the study of bisimplicial sets, which for example includes Kan fibrations and Kan complexes.

== Definition ==
Bisimplicial sets are simplicial objects in the category of simplicial sets $\mathbf{sSet}$, hence functors $\Delta^\mathrm{op}\rightarrow\mathbf{sSet}$ with the simplex category $\Delta$. The category of bisimplicial sets is denoted:

$$\mathbf{bisSet}
:=\mathbf{Fun}(\Delta^\mathrm{op},\mathbf{sSet})
\cong\mathbf{Fun}((\Delta\times\Delta)^\mathrm{op},\mathbf{Set})$$

Let $\operatorname{pr}_1,\operatorname{pr}_2\colon \Delta\times\Delta\rightarrow\Delta$ be the canonical projections, then there are induced functors $\operatorname{pr}_1^*,\operatorname{pr}_2^*\colon \mathbf{sSet}\rightarrow\mathbf{bisSet}$ by precomposition. For simplicial sets $X$ and $Y$, there is a bisimplicial set $X\boxtimes Y$with:

$$X\boxtimes Y
=\operatorname{pr}_1^*(A)\times\operatorname{pr}_1^*(B),$$
$$(X\boxtimes Y)_{m,n}
=X_m\times Y_n.$$

Let $\delta\colon \Delta\rightarrow\Delta\times\Delta$ be the diagonal functor, then there is an induced functor $\delta^*=\operatorname{diag}\colon \mathbf{bisSet}\rightarrow\mathbf{sSet}$ by precomposition. For a bisimplicial set $Z$, there is a simplicial set $\delta^*(Z)$ with:

$$\delta^*(Z)_n
=Z_{n,n}.$$

== Adjoints ==
The diagonal $\delta^*=\operatorname{diag}\colon \mathbf{bisSet}\rightarrow\mathbf{sSet}$ has a left adjoint $\delta_!\colon \mathbf{sSet}\rightarrow\mathbf{bisSet}$ with $\delta_!\dashv\delta^*$ and a right adjoint $\delta_*\colon \mathbf{sSet}\rightarrow\mathbf{bisSet}$ with $\delta^*\dashv\delta_*$.

Let $K$ be a simplicial set. The functor $K\boxtimes-\colon \mathbf{sSet}\rightarrow\mathbf{bisSet}$ has a right adjoint:

$${}^K-\colon
\mathbf{bisSet}\rightarrow\mathbf{sSet},
({}^KX)_n
:=\operatorname{Hom}(K\boxtimes\Delta^n,X)
=\varprojlim_{\Delta^m\rightarrow K}X_{m,n}.$$

The functor $-\boxtimes K\colon \mathbf{sSet}\rightarrow\mathbf{bisSet}$ has a right adjoint:

$$-^K\colon
\mathbf{bisSet}\rightarrow\mathbf{sSet},
(X^K)_m
:=\operatorname{Hom}(\Delta^n\boxtimes K,X)
=\varprojlim_{\Delta^n\rightarrow K}X_{m,n}.$$

== Model structures ==
Model structures from the category of simplicial sets, with the most important being the Joyal and Kan–Quillen model structure, can be transported over to the category of bisimplicial sets using the injective and projective model structure. But it is more useful to instead take the analog replacements of the morphisms $\partial\Delta^n\rightarrow\Delta^n$ and $\Lambda_k^n\rightarrow\Delta^n$, which are:

$$\partial\Delta^m\boxtimes\Delta^n\cup\Delta^m\boxtimes\partial\Delta^n\rightarrow\Delta^m\boxtimes\Delta^n,$$
$$\Lambda_k^m\boxtimes\Delta^n\cup\Delta^m\boxtimes\partial\Delta^n\rightarrow\Delta^m\boxtimes\Delta^n,$$
$$\partial\Delta^m\boxtimes\Delta^n\cup\Delta^m\boxtimes\Lambda_k^n\rightarrow\Delta^m\boxtimes\Delta^n$$

and which lead from Kan fibrations to bifibrations, left/right fibrations to left/right bifibrations, anodyne extensions to bi-anodyne extensions, left/right anodyne extensions to left/right bi-anodyne extensions and Kan complexes to Kan bicomplexes.

== Properties ==
- The diagonal functor $\delta^*=\operatorname{diag}\colon \mathbf{bisSet}\rightarrow\mathbf{sSet}$ send left/right bi-anodyne extensions to left/right anodyne extensions.
- The diagonal functor $\delta_!\colon \mathbf{sSet}\rightarrow\mathbf{bisSet}$ send left/right anodyne extensions to left/right bi-anodyne extensions.
- For simplicial sets $X$ and $Y$, one has an isomorphism of slice categories:
  $$(\Delta\times\Delta)/(A\boxtimes B)
\cong\Delta/A\times\Delta/B,$$
  $$\delta^*(A\boxtimes B)
\cong A\times B.$$

== Literature ==
- Cisinski, Denis-Charles (2019-06-30). Higher Categories and Homotopical Algebra (PDF). Cambridge University Press. ISBN 978-1108473200.
