= Diamond operation =

Construction for simplicial sets

In higher category theory in mathematics, the diamond operation of simplicial sets is an operation taking two simplicial sets to construct another simplicial set. It is closely related to the join of simplicial sets and used in an alternative construction of the twisted diagonal.

== Definition ==
Visualization of the diamond $X\diamond Y$ with the blue part representing $X$ and the green part representing $Y$.

For simplicial set $X$ and $Y$, their diamond $X\diamond Y$ is the pushout of the diagram:

$$X\times Y\times\Delta^1\leftarrow X\times Y\times\partial\Delta^1\rightarrow X+Y.$$

One has a canonical map $X\diamond Y\rightarrow\Delta^0\diamond\Delta^0 \cong\Delta^1$ for which the fiber of $0$ is $X$ and the fiber of $1$ is $Y$.

== Right adjoints ==
Let $Y$ be a simplicial set. The functor $Y\diamond -\colon \mathbf{sSet}\rightarrow Y\backslash\mathbf{sSet}, X\mapsto(Y\mapsto X\diamond Y)$ has a right adjoint $Y\backslash\mathbf{sSet}\rightarrow\mathbf{sSet}, (t\colon Y\rightarrow W)\mapsto t\backslash\backslash W$ (alternatively denoted $Y\backslash\backslash W$) and the functor $-\diamond Y\colon \mathbf{sSet}\rightarrow Y\backslash\mathbf{sSet}, X\mapsto(Y\mapsto X\diamond Y)$ has a right adjoint $Y\backslash\mathbf{sSet}\rightarrow\mathbf{sSet}, (t\colon Y\rightarrow W)\mapsto W//t$ (alternatively denoted $W//Y$). A special case is $Y=\Delta^0$ the terminal simplicial set, since $\mathbf{sSet}_* =\Delta^0\backslash\mathbf{sSet}$ is the category of pointed simplicial sets.

== Properties ==
- For simplicial sets $X$ and $Y$, there is a unique morphism $\gamma_{X,Y}\colon X\diamond Y\rightarrow X*Y$ from the join of simplicial sets compatible with the maps $X+Y\rightarrow X*Y,X\diamond Y$ and $X*Y,X\diamond Y\rightarrow\Delta^1$. It is a weak categorical equivalence, hence a weak equivalence of the Joyal model structure.
- For a simplicial set $X$, the functors $X\diamond -,-\diamond X\colon\mathbf{sSet}\rightarrow\mathbf{sSet}$ preserve weak categorical equivalences.

== Literature ==
- Joyal, André (2008). "The Theory of Quasi-Categories and its Applications" (PDF).
- Lurie, Jacob (2009). Higher Topos Theory. Annals of Mathematics Studies. Vol. 170. Princeton University Press. arXiv:math.CT/0608040. ISBN 978-0-691-14049-0. MR 2522659.
- Cisinski, Denis-Charles (2019-06-30). Higher Categories and Homotopical Algebra (PDF). Cambridge University Press. ISBN 978-1108473200.
