= Proper model structure =

Special kind of model structure

In higher category theory in mathematics, a proper model structure is a model structure in which additionally weak equivalences are preserved under pullback (fiber product) along fibrations, called right proper, and pushouts (cofiber product) along cofibrations, called left proper. It is helpful to construct weak equivalences and hence to find isomorphic objects in the homotopy theory of the model structure.

== Definition ==
For every model category, one has:

- Pushouts of weak equivalences between cofibrant objects along cofibrations are again weak equivalences.
- Pullbacks of weak equivalences between fibrant objects along fibrations are again weak equivalences.

A model category is then called:

- left proper, if pushouts of weak equivalences along cofibrations are again weak equivalences.
- right proper, if pullbacks of weak equivalences along fibrations are again weak equivalences.
- proper, if it is both left proper and right proper.

== Properties ==
- A model category, in which all objects are cofibrant, is left proper.
- A model category, in which all objects are fibrant, is right proper.

For a model category $\mathcal{M}$ and a morphism $f\colon X\rightarrow Y$ in it, there is a functor $f^*\colon Y\backslash\mathcal{M}\rightarrow X\backslash\mathcal{M}$ by precomposition and a functor $f_*\colon \mathcal{M}/X\rightarrow\mathcal{M}/Y$ by postcomposition. Furthermore, pushout defines a functor $Y+_X-\colon X\backslash\mathcal{M}\rightarrow Y\backslash\mathcal{M}$ and pullback defines a functor $X\times_Y-\colon \mathcal{M}/Y\rightarrow\mathcal{M}/X$. One has:

- $\mathcal{M}$ is left proper if and only if for every weak equivalence $f\colon X\rightarrow Y$, the adjunction $f_*\colon \mathcal{M}/X\rightarrow\mathcal{M}/Y\colon X\times_Y-$ forms a Quillen adjunction.
- $\mathcal{M}$ is right proper if and only if for every weak equivalence $f\colon X\rightarrow Y$, the adjunction $Y+_X-\colon X\backslash\mathcal{M}\rightarrow Y\backslash\mathcal{M}\colon f^*$ forms a Quillen adjunction.

== Examples ==
- The Joyal model structure is left proper, but not right proper. Left properness follows from all objects being cofibrant.
- The Kan–Quillen model structure is proper. Left properness follows from all objects being cofibrant.

== Literature ==
- Rezk, Charles (2000). "Every homotopy theory of simplicial algebras admits a proper model". Topology and Its Applications. 119: 65–94. arXiv:math/0003065. doi:10.1016/S0166-8641(01)00057-8.
- Hirschhorn, Philip (2002). Model Categories and Their Localizations (PDF). Mathematical Surveys and Monographs. ISBN 978-0-8218-4917-0.
- Joyal, André (2008). "The Theory of Quasi-Categories and its Applications" (PDF).
- Lurie, Jacob (2009). Higher Topos Theory. Annals of Mathematics Studies. Vol. 170. Princeton University Press. arXiv:math.CT/0608040. ISBN 978-0-691-14049-0. MR 2522659.
- Cisinski, Denis-Charles (2019-06-30). Higher Categories and Homotopical Algebra (PDF). Cambridge University Press. ISBN 978-1108473200.
