= Extension (simplicial set) =

Endofunctor on the category of simplicial sets

In higher category theory in mathematics, the extension of simplicial sets (extension functor or Ex functor) is an endofunctor on the category of simplicial sets. Due to many remarkable properties, the extension functor has plenty and strong applications in homotopical algebra. Among the most well-known is its application in the construction of Kan complexes from arbitrary simplicial sets, which often enables without loss of generality to take the former for proofs about the latter. It is furthermore very well compatible with the Kan–Quillen model structure and can for example be used to explicitly state its factorizations or to search for weak homotopy equivalences.

== Definition ==
Using the subdivision of simplicial sets, the extension of simplicial sets is defined as:

$$\operatorname{Ex}\colon
\mathbf{sSet}\rightarrow\mathbf{sSet},
\operatorname{Ex}(Y)_n
:=\operatorname{Hom}(\operatorname{Sd}(\Delta^n),Y).$$

Due to the Yoneda lemma, one also has $\operatorname{Ex}(Y)_n \cong\operatorname{Hom}(\Delta^n,\operatorname{Ex}(Y))$. All connecting maps of the sets are given by precomposition with the application of the subdivision functor to all canonical inclusions $\Delta^{n-1}\hookrightarrow\Delta^n$. Since the subdivision functor by definition commutes with all colimits, and for every simplicial set $X$ there is an isomorphism:

$$X\cong\varinjlim_{\Delta^n\rightarrow X}\Delta^n,$$

it is in fact left adjoint to the extension functor, denoted $\operatorname{Sd}\dashv\operatorname{Ex}$. For simplicial sets $X$ and $Y$, one has:

$$\begin{align}
\operatorname{Hom}(\operatorname{Sd}(X),Y)
&\cong\operatorname{Hom}(\operatorname{Sd}(\varinjlim_{\Delta^n\rightarrow X}\Delta^n),Y)
\cong\operatorname{Hom}(\varinjlim_{\Delta^n\rightarrow X}\operatorname{Sd}(\Delta^n),Y)
\cong\varprojlim_{\Delta^n\rightarrow X}\operatorname{Hom}(\operatorname{Sd}(\Delta^n),Y) \\
&\cong\varprojlim_{\Delta^n\rightarrow X}\operatorname{Hom}(\Delta^n,\operatorname{Ex}(Y))
\cong\operatorname{Hom}(\varinjlim_{\Delta^n\rightarrow X}\Delta^n,\operatorname{Ex}(Y))
\cong\operatorname{Hom}(X,\operatorname{Ex}(Y)).
\end{align}$$

It is therefore possible to also simply define the extension functor as the right adjoint to the subdivision functor. Both of their construction as extension by colimits and definition is similar to that of the adjunction between geometric realization and the singular functor, with an important difference being that there is no isomorphism:

$$X\cong\varinjlim_{|\Delta^n|\rightarrow X}|\Delta^n|$$

for every topological space $X$. This is because the colimit is always a CW complex, for which the isomorphism does indeed hold.

The natural transformation $a\colon\operatorname{Sd}\Rightarrow\operatorname{Id}$ induces a natural transformation $b\colon \operatorname{Id}\Rightarrow\operatorname{Ex}$ under the adjunction $\operatorname{Sd}\dashv\operatorname{Ex}$. In particular there is a canonical morphism $b_X\colon X\rightarrow\operatorname{Ex}(X)$ for every simplicial set $X$.

== Ex∞ functor ==
For a simplicial set $X$, the canonical morphism $b_X\colon X\rightarrow\operatorname{Ex}(X)$ includes an $\mathbb{N}$-shaped cone $X\rightarrow\operatorname{Ex}(X)\rightarrow\operatorname{Ex}^2(X)\rightarrow\operatorname{Ex}^3(X)\rightarrow\ldots$, whose limit is denoted:

$$\operatorname{Ex}^\infty(X)
:=\varinjlim_{n\in\mathbb{N}}\operatorname{Ex}^n(X).$$

Since limit and colimit are switched, there is no adjunction $\operatorname{Sd}^\infty\dashv\operatorname{Ex}^\infty$ with the Sd∞ functor. But for the study of simplices, this is of no concern as any $m$-simplex $\Delta^m\rightarrow\operatorname{Ex}^\infty(X)$ due to the compactness of the standard $m$-simplex $\Delta^m$ factors over a morphism $\Delta^m\rightarrow\operatorname{Ex}^n(X)$ for a $n\in\mathbb{N}$, for which the adjunction $\operatorname{Sd}^n\dashv\operatorname{Ex}^n$ can then be applied to get a morphism $\operatorname{Sd}^n(\Delta^m)\rightarrow X$.

The natural transformation $b\colon \operatorname{Id}\Rightarrow\operatorname{Ex}$ induces a natural transformation $\beta\colon \operatorname{Id}\Rightarrow\operatorname{Ex}^\infty$. In particular there is a canonical morphism $\beta_X\colon X\rightarrow\operatorname{Ex}^\infty(X)$ for every simplicial set $X$.

== Properties ==
- For every simplicial set $X$, the canonical morphism $b_X\colon X\rightarrow\operatorname{Ex}(X)$ is a weak homotopy equivalence.
- The extension functor $\operatorname{Ex}$ preserves weak homotopy equivalences (which follows directly from the preceding property and their 2-of-3 property) and Kan fibrations, hence fibrations and trivial fibrations of the Kan–Quillen model structure. This makes the adjunction $\operatorname{Sd}\dashv\operatorname{Ex}$ even into a Quillen adjunction $\operatorname{Sd}\colon \mathbf{sSet}_\mathrm{KQ}\rightleftarrows\mathbf{sSet}_\mathrm{KQ}\colon \operatorname{Ex}$.
- For every horn inclusion $\Lambda_k^n\hookrightarrow\operatorname{Ex}(X)$ with a simplicial set $X$ there exists an extension $\Delta^n\hookrightarrow\operatorname{Ex}^2(X)$.
- For every simplicial set $X$, the simplicial set $\operatorname{Ex}^\infty(X)$ is a Kan complex, hence a fibrant object of the Kan–Quillen model structure. This follows directly from the preceding property. Furthermore the canonical morphism $\beta_X\colon X\hookrightarrow\operatorname{Ex}^\infty(X)$ is a monomorphism and a weak homotopy equivalence, hence a trivial cofibration of the Kan–Quillen model structure. $\operatorname{Ex}^\infty(X)$ is therefore the fibrant replacement of $X$ in the Kan–Quillen model structure, hence the factorization of the terminal morphism $X\rightarrow\Delta^0$ in a trivial cofibration followed by a fibration. Furthermore, there is a restriction $\operatorname{Ex}^\infty\colon \mathbf{sSet}\rightarrow\mathbf{Kan}$ with the subcategory $\mathbf{Kan}\hookrightarrow\mathbf{sSet}$ of Kan complexes.
- The infinite extension functor $\operatorname{Ex}^\infty$ preserves all three classes of the Kan–Quillen model structure, hence Kan fibrations, monomorphisms and weak homotopy equivalences (which again follows directly from the preceding property and their 2-of-3 property).
- The extension functor $\operatorname{Ex}$ and the infinite extension functor $\operatorname{Ex}^\infty$ both preserve the set of $0$-simplices, which follows directly from $\operatorname{Sd}(\Delta^0) \cong\Delta^0$. For a simplicial set $X$, one has:
  $$\operatorname{Ex}(X)_0
=X_0,$$
  $$\operatorname{Ex}^\infty(X)_0
=X_0.$$
- The extension functor fixes the singular functor. For a topological space $X$, one has:

$$\operatorname{Ex}\operatorname{Sing}(X)
\cong\operatorname{Sing}(X).$$

This follows from $|\operatorname{Sd}(X)| \cong|X|$ for every simplicial set $X$ by using the adjunctions $|-|\dashv\operatorname{Sing}$ and $\operatorname{Sd}\dashv\operatorname{Ex}$. In particular, for a topological space $X$, one has:

$$\operatorname{Ex}^\infty\operatorname{Sing}(X)
\cong\operatorname{Sing}(X),$$

which fits the fact that the singular functor already produces a Kan complex, which can be its own fibrant replacement.

== Literature ==
- Goerss, Paul; Jardine, John Frederick (1999). Simplicial homotopy theory. Modern Birkhäuser Classics. doi:10.1007/978-3-0346-0189-4. ISBN 978-3-0346-0188-7. Archived from the original on 8 February 1999.
- Cisinski, Denis-Charles (2019-06-30). Higher Categories and Homotopical Algebra (PDF). Cambridge University Press. ISBN 978-1108473200.
- Guillou, Bertrand. "Kan's Ex∞ functor" (PDF).
