= Cisinski model structure =

Special kind of model structure

In higher category theory in mathematics, a Cisinski model structure is a special kind of model structure on Grothendieck topoi. In homotopical algebra, the category of simplicial sets is of particular interest. Cisinski model structures are named after Denis-Charles Cisinski, who introduced them in 2001. His work is based on unfinished ideas presented by Alexander Grothendieck in his script Pursuing Stacks from 1983.

== Definition ==
A cofibrantly generated model structure on a topos, for the cofibrations are exactly the monomorphisms, is called a Cisinski model structure. Cofibrantly generated means that there are small sets $I$ and $J$ of morphisms, on which the small object argument can be applied, so that they generate all cofibrations and trivial cofibrations using the lifting property:

$$\operatorname{Cofib}
={}^\perp(I^\perp);$$
$$W\cap\operatorname{Cofib}
={}^\perp(J^\perp);$$

More generally, a small set generating the class of monomorphisms of a category of presheaves is called cellular model:

$$\operatorname{Mono}
={}^\perp(I^\perp).$$

Every topos admits a cellular model.

== Examples ==
- Joyal model structure: Cofibrations (monomorphisms) are generated by the boundary inclusions $\partial\Delta^n\hookrightarrow\Delta^n$ and acyclic cofibrations (inner anodyne extensions) are generated by inner horn inclusions $\Lambda_k^n\hookrightarrow\Delta^n$ (with $n\geq 2$ and $0<k<n$).
- Kan–Quillen model structure: Cofibrations (monomorphisms) are generated by the boundary inclusions $\partial\Delta^n\hookrightarrow\Delta^n$ and acyclic cofibrations (anodyne extensions) are generated by horn inclusions $\Lambda_k^n\hookrightarrow\Delta^n$ (with $n\geq 2$ and $0\leq k\leq n$).

== Literature ==
- Cisinski, Denis-Charles (September 2002). "Théories homotopiques dans les topos". Journal of Pure and Applied Algebra (in French). 174 (1): 43–82. doi:10.1016/S0022-4049(01)00176-1.
- Georges Maltsiniotis (2005), "La théorie de l'homotopie de Grothendieck" [Grothendieck's homotopy theory] (PDF), Astérisque, 301, MR 2200690
- Denis-Charles Cisinski (2006), "Les préfaisceaux comme modèles des types d'homotopie" (PDF), Astérisque [Presheaves as models for homotopy types], vol. 308, ISBN 978-2-85629-225-9, MR 2294028
- Cisinski, Denis-Charles (2019-06-30). Higher Categories and Homotopical Algebra (PDF). Cambridge University Press. ISBN 978-1108473200.
