= Injective and projective model structure =

In higher category theory in mathematics, injective and projective model structures are special model structures on functor categories into a model category. Both model structures do not have to exist, but there are conditions guaranteeing their existence. An important application is for the study of limits and colimits, which are functors from a functor category and can therefore be made into Quillen adjunctions.

== Definition ==
Let $\mathcal{I}$ be a small category and $\mathcal{C}$ be a model category. For two functors $F,G\colon \mathcal{I}\rightarrow\mathcal{C}$, a natural transformation $\eta\colon F\Rightarrow G$ is composed of morphisms $\eta_X\colon FX\rightarrow GX$ in $\operatorname{Ar}\mathcal{C}$ for all objects $X$ in $\operatorname{Ob}\mathcal{I}$. For those it hence be studied if they are fibrations, cofibrations and weak equivalences, which might lead to a model structure on the functor category $\operatorname{Fun}(\mathcal{I},\mathcal{C})$.

- Injective cofibrations and injective weak equivalences are the natural transformations, which componentswise only consist of cofibrations and weak equivalences respectively. Injective fibrations are those natural transformations which have the right lifting property with respect to all injective trivial cofibrations.
- Projective fibrations and projective weak equivalences are the natural transformations, which componentswise only consist of fibrations and weak equivalences respectively. Projective cofibrations are those natural transformations which have the left lifting property with respect to all projective trivial fibrations.

For a model structure, the injective trivial cofibrations also have to have the right lifting property with respect to all injective fibrations and the projective trivial fibrations also have to have the left lifting property with respect to all projective cofibrations. Since both doesn't have to be the case, the injective and projective model structure doesn't have to exist.

The functor category $\operatorname{Fun}(\mathcal{I},\mathcal{C})$ with the initial and projective model structure is denoted $\operatorname{Fun}(\mathcal{I},\mathcal{C})_\mathrm{inj}$ and $\operatorname{Fun}(\mathcal{I},\mathcal{C})_\mathrm{proj}$ respectively.

== Properties ==
- If $\mathcal{I}$ ist the category assigned to a small well-ordered set with initial element and if $\mathcal{C}$ has all small colimits, then the projective model structure on $\operatorname{Fun}(\mathcal{I},\mathcal{C})$ exists.

== Quillen adjunctions ==
Let $\mathcal{C}$ be a combinatorical model category. Let $F\colon \mathcal{I}\rightarrow\mathcal{J}$ be a functor between small categories, then there is a functor $F^*\colon \mathbf{Fun}(\mathcal{J},\mathcal{C})\rightarrow\mathbf{Fun}(\mathcal{I},\mathcal{C})$ by precomposition. Since $\mathcal{C}$ has all small limits and small colimits, this functor has a left adjoint $F_!\colon \mathbf{Fun}(\mathcal{I},\mathcal{C})\rightarrow\mathbf{Fun}(\mathcal{J},\mathcal{C}), F_!(G)=\operatorname{Lan}_F(G)$ with $F_!\dashv F^*$ known as left Kan extension as well as a right adjoint $F_*\colon \mathbf{Fun}(\mathcal{I},\mathcal{C})\rightarrow\mathbf{Fun}(\mathcal{J},\mathcal{C}), F_*(G)=\operatorname{Ran}_F(G)$ with $F^*\dashv F_!$ known as right Kan extension. While the former adjunction is a Quillen adjunction between the projective model structures, the latter is a Quillen adjunctions between the injective model structures.

== See also ==
- Co- and contravariant model structure, induced model structures on slice categories

== Literature ==
- Lurie, Jacob (2009). Higher Topos Theory. Annals of Mathematics Studies. Vol. 170. Princeton University Press. arXiv:math.CT/0608040. ISBN 978-0-691-14049-0. MR 2522659.
- Cisinski, Denis-Charles (2019-06-30). Higher Categories and Homotopical Algebra (PDF). Cambridge University Press. ISBN 978-1108473200.
