= Subdivision =

Subdivision may refer to:

== Arts and entertainment ==
- Subdivision (metre), in music
- Subdivision (film), 2009
- "Subdivision", an episode of Prison Break (season 2)
- Subdivisions (EP), by Sinch, 2005
- "Subdivisions" (song), by Rush, 1982

== Science, technology and mathematics ==
- Subdivision (rank), a taxonomic rank
- Subdivision (botany), or subphylum, a taxonomic rank
- Subdivision (graph theory), adding new vertices to some edges of a graph, whereby replacing the edges by paths
- Subdivision (simplicial complex)
- Subdivision (simplicial set)
- Subdivision surface, in computer graphics

== Other uses ==
- Subdivision, an administrative division, a portion of a country
- Subdivision (India), an administrative division in India
- Subdivision (land), the act of dividing land into smaller pieces
- A designated and managed section of rail line overseen by a superintendent from a rail yard, roughly analogous to a numbered highway, often with its own spurs and sidings, usually linking two cities

== See also ==
- Division (disambiguation)
