= Fibrant object =

Mathematical concept

In mathematics, specifically in homotopy theory in the context of a model category M, a fibrant object A of M is an object that has a fibration to the terminal object of the category.

== Properties ==
The fibrant objects of a closed model category are characterized by having a right lifting property with respect to any trivial cofibration in the category. This property makes fibrant objects the "correct" objects on which to define homotopy groups. In the context of the theory of simplicial sets, the fibrant objects are known as Kan complexes after Daniel Kan. They are the Kan fibrations over a point.

Dually is the notion of cofibrant object, defined to be an object $c$ such that the unique morphism $\varnothing\to c$ from the initial object to $c$ is a cofibration.
