= Small object argument =

Method of factorization, especially in category theory

In mathematics, especially in category theory, Quillen’s small object argument, when applicable, constructs a factorization of a morphism in a functorial way. In practice, it can be used to show some class of morphisms constitutes a weak factorization system in the theory of model categories.

The argument was introduced by Quillen to construct a model structure on the category of (reasonable) topological spaces. The original argument was later refined by Garner.

== Statement ==
Let $C$ be a category that has all small colimits. We say an object $x$ in it is compact with respect to an ordinal $\omega$ if $\operatorname{Hom}(x, -)$ commutes with an $\omega$-filtered colimit. In practice, we fix $\omega$ and simply say an object is compact if it is so with respect to that fixed $\omega$.

If $F$ is a class of morphisms, we write $l(F)$ for the class of morphisms that satisfy the left lifting property with respect to $F$. Similarly, we write $r(F)$ for the right lifting property. Then

Theorem— Let $F$ be a class of morphisms in $C$. If the source (domain) of each morphism in $F$ is compact, then each morphism $f$ in $C$ admits a functorial factorization $f = p \circ i$ where $i, p$ are in $l(r(F)), r(F)$.

== Example: presheaf ==
Here is a simple example of how the argument works in the case of the category $C$ of presheaves on some small category.

Let $I$ denote the set of monomorphisms of the form $K \to L$, $L$ a quotient of a representable presheaf. Then $l(r(I))$ can be shown to be equal to the class of monomorphisms. Then the small object argument says: each presheaf morphism $f$ can be factored as $f = p \circ i$ where $i$ is a monomorphism and $p$ in $r(I) = r(l(r(I))$; i.e., $p$ is a morphism having the right lifting property with respect to monomorphisms.

== Proof ==
For now, see: But roughly the construction is a sort of successive approximation.

== See also ==
- Anodyne extension
