= Fibration of simplicial sets =

In mathematics, especially in homotopy theory, a left fibration of simplicial sets is a map that has the right lifting property with respect to the horn inclusions $\Lambda^n_i \subset \Delta^n, 0 \le i < n$. A right fibration is defined similarly with the condition $0 < i \le n$. A Kan fibration is one with the right lifting property with respect to every horn inclusion; hence, a Kan fibration is exactly a map that is both a left and right fibration.

== Examples ==
A right fibration is a cartesian fibration such that each fiber is a Kan complex.

In particular, a category fibered in groupoids over another category is a special case of a right fibration of simplicial sets in the ∞-category setup.

== Anodyne extensions ==
A left anodyne extension is a map in the saturation of the set of the horn inclusions $\Lambda^n_k \to \Delta^n$ for $n \ge 1, 0 \le k < n$ in the category of simplicial sets, where the saturation of a class is the smallest class that contains the class and is stable under pushouts, retracts and transfinite compositions (compositions of infinitely many maps). A right anodyne extension is defined by replacing the condition $0 \le k < n$ with $0 < k \le n$. The notions are originally due to Gabriel–Zisman and are used to study fibrations for simplicial sets.

A left (or right) anodyne extension is a monomorphism (since the class of monomorphisms is saturated, the saturation lies in the class of monomorphisms).

Given a class $F$ of maps, let $r(F)$ denote the class of maps satisfying the right lifting property with respect to $F$. Then $r(F) = r(\overline{F})$ for the saturation $\overline{F}$ of $F$. Thus, a map is a left (resp. right) fibration if and only if it has the right lifting property with respect to left (resp. right) anodyne extensions.

An inner anodyne extension is a map in the saturation of the horn inclusions $\Lambda^n_k \to \Delta^n$ for $n \ge 1, 0 < k < n$. The maps having the right lifting property with respect to inner anodyne extensions or equivalently with respect to the horn inclusions $\Lambda^n_k \to \Delta^n, \, n \ge 1, 0 < k < n$ are called inner fibrations. Simplicial sets are then weak Kan complexes (∞-categories) if unique maps to the final object are inner fibrations.

An isofibration $p : X \to Y$ is an inner fibration such that for each object (0-simplex) $x_0$ in $X$ and an invertible map $g : y_0 \to y_1$ with $p(x_0) = y_0$ in $Y$, there exists a map $f$ in $X$ such that $p(f) = g$. For example, a left (or right) fibration between weak Kan complexes is a conservative isofibration.

== Theorem of Gabriel and Zisman ==
Given monomorphisms $i : A \to B$ and $k : Y \to Z$, let $i \sqcup_{A \times Y} k$ denote the pushout of $i \times \operatorname{id}_Y$ and $\operatorname{id}_A \times k$. Then a theorem of Gabriel and Zisman says: if $i$ is a left (resp. right) anodyne extension, then the induced map

$$i \sqcup_{A \times Y} k \to B \times Z$$

is a left (resp. right) anodyne extension. Similarly, if $i$ is an inner anodyne extension, then the above induced map is an inner anodyne extension.

A special case of the above is the covering homotopy extension property: a Kan fibration has the right lifting property with respect to $(Y \times I) \sqcup (Z \times 0) \to Z \times I$ for monomorphisms $Y \to Z$ and $0 \to I = \Delta^1$.

As a corollary of the theorem, a map $p : X \to Y$ is an inner fibration if and only if for each monomorphism $i : A \to B$, the induced map

$$(i^*, p_*) : \underline{\operatorname{Hom}}(B, X) \to \underline{\operatorname{Hom}}(A, X) \times_{\underline{\operatorname{Hom}}(A, Y)} \underline{\operatorname{Hom}}(B, Y)$$

is an inner fibration. Similarly, if $p$ is a left (resp. right) fibration, then $(i^*, p_*)$ is a left (resp. right) fibration.

== Model category structure ==
The category of simplicial sets sSet has the standard model category structure where

- The cofibrations are the monomorphisms,
- The fibrations are the Kan fibrations,
- The weak equivalences are the maps $f$ such that $f^*$ is bijective on simplicial homotopy classes for each Kan complex (fibrant object),
- A fibration is trivial (i.e., has the right lifting property with respect to monomorphisms) if and only if it is a weak equivalence,
- A cofibration is an anodyne extension if and only if it is a weak equivalence.

Because of the last property, an anodyne extension is also known as an acyclic cofibration (a cofibration that is a weak equivalence). Also, the weak equivalences between Kan complexes are the same as the simplicial homotopy equivalences between them.

Under the geometric realization | - | : sSet → Top, we have:

- A map $f$ is a weak equivalence if and only if $|f|$ is a homotopy equivalence.
- A map $f$ is a fibration if and only if $|f|$ is a (usual) fibration in the sense of Hurewicz or of Serre.
- For an anodyne extension $i$, $|i|$ admits a strong deformation retract.

== Universal left fibration ==
Let $U$ be the simplicial set where each n-simplex consists of

- a map $p : X \to \Delta^n$ from a (small) simplicial set X,
- a section $s$ of $p$,
- for each integer $m \ge 0$ and for each map $f : \Delta^m \to \Delta^n$, a choice of a pullback of $p$ along $f$.

Now, a conjecture of Nichols-Barrer which is now a theorem says that U is the same thing as the ∞-category of ∞-groupoids (Kan complexes) together with some choices. In particular, there is a forgetful map

$p_{univ} : U \to \textbf{Kan}$ = the ∞-category of Kan complexes,

which is a left fibration. It is universal in the following sense: for each simplicial set X, there is a natural bijection

$[X, \textbf{Kan}] \, \overset{\sim}\to$ the set of the isomorphism classes of left fibrations over X

given by pulling-back $p_{univ}$, where $[, ]$ means the simplicial homotopy classes of maps. In short, $\textbf{Kan}$ is the classifying space of left fibrations. Given a left fibration over X, a map $X \to \textbf{Kan}$ corresponding to it is called the classifying map for that fibration.

In Cisinski's book, the hom-functor $\operatorname{Hom} : C^{op} \times C \to \textbf{Kan}$ on an ∞-category C is then simply defined to be the classifying map for the left fibration

$$(s, t) : S(C) \to C^{op} \times C$$

where each n-simplex in $S(C)$ is a map $(\Delta^n)^{op} * \Delta^n \to C$. In fact, $S(C)$ is an ∞-category called the twisted diagonal of C.

In his Higher Topos Theory, Lurie constructs an analogous universal cartesian fibration.

== See also ==
- small object argument
