= Twisted diagonal =

Twisted diagonal may refer to:

- Twisted diagonal (category theory)
- Twisted diagonal (simplicial sets)
