= Opposite simplicial set =

Construction for simplicial sets

In higher category theory in mathematics, the opposite simplicial set (or dual simplicial set) is an operation extending the opposite category (or dual category). It generalizes the concept of inverting arrows from 1-categories to ∞-categories. Similar to the opposite category defining an involution on the category of small categories, the opposite simplicial sets defines an involution on the category of simplicial sets. Both correspond to each other under the nerve construction.

== Definition ==
On the simplex category $\Delta$, there is an automorphism $\rho\colon \Delta\rightarrow\Delta$, which for a map $f\colon [m]\rightarrow[n]$ is given by $\rho(f)(i):=n-f(m-i)$. It fulfills $\rho^2=\operatorname{Id}$ and is the only automorphism on the simplex category $\Delta$. By precomposition, it defines a functor $\rho^*\colon \mathbf{sSet}\rightarrow\mathbf{sSet}$ on the category of simplicial sets $\mathbf{sSet} =\mathbf{Fun}(\Delta,\mathbf{sSet})$. For a simplicial set $X$, the simplicial set $X^\mathrm{op} =\rho^*(X)$is its opposite simplicial set.

== Properties ==
- For a simplicial set $X$, one has:
  $$(X^\mathrm{op})^\mathrm{op}
\cong X.$$
- For a category $\mathcal{C}$, one has:
  $$N(\mathcal{C}^\mathrm{op})
=(N\mathcal{C})^\mathrm{op}.$$
- A simplicial set $X$ is an ∞-category if and only if its opposite simplicial set $X^\mathrm{op}$ is.
- A simplicial set $X$ is a Kan complex if and only if opposite simplicial set $X^\mathrm{op}$ is.

== Literature ==
- Lurie, Jacob (2009). Higher Topos Theory. Annals of Mathematics Studies. Vol. 170. Princeton University Press. arXiv:math.CT/0608040. ISBN 978-0-691-14049-0. MR 2522659.
- Cisinski, Denis-Charles (2019-06-30). Higher Categories and Homotopical Algebra (PDF). Cambridge University Press. ISBN 978-1108473200.
