= Joyal model structure =

Model structure on the category of simplicial sets

In higher category theory in mathematics, the Joyal model structure is a special model structure on the category of simplicial sets. It consists of three classes of morphisms between simplicial sets called fibrations, cofibrations and weak equivalences, which fulfill the properties of a model structure. Its fibrant objects are all ∞-categories and it furthermore models the homotopy theory of CW complexes up to homotopy equivalence, with the correspondence between simplicial sets and CW complexes being given by the geometric realization and the singular functor. The Joyal model structure is named after André Joyal.

== Definition ==
The Joyal model structure is given by:

- Fibrations are isofibrations.
- Cofibrations are monomorphisms.
- Weak equivalences are weak categorical equivalences, hence morphisms between simplicial sets, whose geometric realization is a homotopy equivalence between CW complexes.
- Trivial cofibrations are inner anodyne extensions.

The category of simplicial sets $\mathbf{sSet}$ with the Joyal model structure is denoted $\mathbf{sSet}_\mathrm{J}$ (or $\mathbf{sSet}_\mathrm{Joy}$ for more joy).

== Properties ==
- Fibrant objects of the Joyal model structure, hence simplicial sets $X$, for which the terminal morphism $X\xrightarrow{!}\Delta^0$ is a fibration, are the ∞-categories.
- Cofibrant objects of the Joyal model structure, hence simplicial sets $X$, for which the initial morphism $\emptyset\xrightarrow{!}X$ is a cofibration, are all simplicial sets.
- The Joyal model structure is left proper, which follows directly from all objects being cofibrant. This means that weak categorical equivalences are preversed by pushout along its cofibrations (the monomorphisms). The Joyal model structure is not right proper. For example the inclusion $\Lambda_1^2\hookrightarrow\Delta^2$ is a weak categorical equivalence, but its pullback along the isofibration $\Delta^1\cong\{0\rightarrow 2\}\hookrightarrow\Delta^2$, which is $(0,1)\colon \Delta^0+\Delta^0\hookrightarrow\Delta^1$, is not due for example the different number of connected components. This counterexample doesn't work for the Kan–Quillen model structure since $\Delta^1\cong\{0\rightarrow 2\}\hookrightarrow\Delta^2$ is not a Kan fibration. But the pullback of weak categorical equivalences along left or right Kan fibrations is again a weak categorical equivalence.
- The Joyal model structure is a Cisinski model structure and in particular cofibrantly generated. Cofibrations (monomorphisms) are generated by the boundary inclusions $\partial\Delta^n\hookrightarrow\Delta^n$ and acyclic cofibrations (inner anodyne extensions) are generated by inner horn inclusions $\Lambda_k^n\hookrightarrow\Delta^n$ (with $n\geq 2$ and $0<k<n$).
- Weak categorical equivalences are final.
- Inner anodyne extensions are weak categorical equivalences.
- Weak categorical equivalences are closed under finite products and small filtered colimits.
- Since the Kan–Quillen model structure also has monomorphisms as cofibrations and every weak homotopy equivalence is a weak categorical equivalence, the identity $\operatorname{Id}\colon \mathbf{sSet}_\mathrm{KQ}\rightarrow\mathbf{sSet}_\mathrm{J}$ preserves both cofibrations and acyclic cofibrations, hence as a left adjoint with the identity $\operatorname{Id}\colon \mathbf{sSet}_\mathrm{J}\rightarrow\mathbf{sSet}_\mathrm{KQ}$ as right adjoint forms a Quillen adjunction.

== Local weak categorical equivalence ==
For a simplicial set $B$ and a morphism of simplicial sets $f\colon X\rightarrow Y$ over $B$ (so that there are morphisms $p\colon X\rightarrow B$ and $q\colon Y\rightarrow B$ with $p=q\circ f$), the following conditions are equivalent:

- For every $n$-simplex $\sigma\colon\Delta^n\rightarrow B$, the induced map $\Delta^n\times_B\sigma\colon \Delta^n\times_BX\rightarrow\Delta^n\times_BY$ is a weak categorical equivalence.
- For every morphism $g\colon A\rightarrow B$, the induced map $A\times_Bg\colon A\times_BX\rightarrow A\times_BY$ is a weak categorical equivalence.

Such a morphism is called a local weak categorical equivalence.

- Every local weak categorical equivalence is a weak categorical equivalence.

== Literature ==
- Joyal, André (2008). "The Theory of Quasi-Categories and its Applications" (PDF).
- Lurie, Jacob (2009). Higher Topos Theory. Annals of Mathematics Studies. Vol. 170. Princeton University Press. arXiv:math.CT/0608040. ISBN 978-0-691-14049-0. MR 2522659.
- Cisinski, Denis-Charles (2019-06-30). Higher Categories and Homotopical Algebra (PDF). Cambridge University Press. ISBN 978-1108473200.
