= Bousfield localization =

In category theory, a branch of mathematics, a (left) Bousfield localization of a model category replaces the model structure with another model structure with the same cofibrations but with more weak equivalences.

Bousfield localization is named after Aldridge Bousfield, who first introduced this technique in the context of localization of topological spaces and spectra.

== Model category structure of the Bousfield localization ==
Given a class C of morphisms in a model category M the left Bousfield localization is a new model structure on the same category as before. Its equivalences, cofibrations and fibrations, respectively, are

- the C-local equivalences
- the original cofibrations of M

and (necessarily, since cofibrations and weak equivalences determine the fibrations)

- the maps having the right lifting property with respect to the cofibrations in M which are also C-local equivalences.

In this definition, a C-local equivalence is a map $f\colon X \to Y$ which, roughly speaking, does not make a difference when mapping to a C-local object. More precisely, $f^* \colon \operatorname{map} (Y, W) \to \operatorname{map} (X, W)$ is required to be a weak equivalence (of simplicial sets) for any C-local object W. An object W is called C-local if it is fibrant (in M) and

$$s^* \colon \operatorname{map} (B, W) \to \operatorname{map} (A, W)$$

is a weak equivalence for all maps $s\colon A \to B$ in C. The notation $\operatorname{map}(-, -)$ is, for a general model category (not necessarily enriched over simplicial sets) a certain simplicial set whose set of path components agrees with morphisms in the homotopy category of M:

$$\pi_0 (\operatorname{map}(X, Y)) = \operatorname{Hom}_{Ho(M)}(X, Y).$$

If M is a simplicial model category (such as, say, simplicial sets or topological spaces), then "map" above can be taken to be the derived simplicial mapping space of M.

This description does not make any claim about the existence of this model structure, for which see below.

Dually, there is a notion of right Bousfield localization, whose definition is obtained by replacing cofibrations by fibrations (and reversing directions of all arrows).

== Existence ==
The left Bousfield localization model structure, as described above, is known to exist in various situations, provided that C is a set:

- M is left proper (i.e., the pushout of a weak equivalence along a cofibration is again a weak equivalence) and combinatorial
- M is left proper and cellular.

Combinatoriality and cellularity of a model category guarantee, in particular, a strong control over the cofibrations of M.

Similarly, the right Bousfield localization exists if M is right proper and cellular or combinatorial and C is a set.

== Universal property ==
The localization $C[W^{-1}]$ of an (ordinary) category C with respect to a class W of morphisms satisfies the following universal property:

- There is a functor $C \to C[W^{-1}]$ which sends all morphisms in W to isomorphisms.
- Any functor $C \to D$ that sends W to isomorphisms in D factors uniquely over the previously mentioned functor.

The Bousfield localization is the appropriate analogous notion for model categories, keeping in mind that isomorphisms in ordinary category theory are replaced by weak equivalences. That is, the (left) Bousfield localization $L_C M$ is such that

- There is a left Quillen functor $M \to L_C M$ whose left derived functor sends all morphisms in C to weak equivalences.
- Any left Quillen functor $M \to N$ whose left derived functor sends C to weak equivalences factors uniquely through $M\to L_C M$.

== Examples ==
=== Localization and completion of a spectrum ===
Localization and completion of a spectrum at a prime number p are both examples of Bousfield localization, resulting in a local spectrum. For example, localizing the sphere spectrum S at p, one obtains a local sphere $S_{(p)}$.

=== Stable model structure on spectra ===
The stable homotopy category is the homotopy category (in the sense of model categories) of spectra, endowed with the stable model structure. The stable model structure is obtained as a left Bousfield localization of the level (or projective) model structure on spectra, whose weak equivalences (fibrations) are those maps which are weak equivalences (fibrations, respectively) in all levels.

=== Morita model structure on dg categories ===
Morita model structure on the category of small dg categories is Bousfield localization of the standard model structure (the one for which the weak equivalences are the quasi-equivalences).

== See also ==
- Localization of a topological space
