= Minimal fibration =

In mathematics, especially homotopy theory, a minimal fibration is used to approximate fibrations between presheaves. A minimal fibration has a defining property that an equivalence between them (in some sense) is an isomorphism. Thus, minimal fibrations can be used to study some coherence questions up to equivalences.

Perhaps the most basic example is a minimal Kan fibration, which is a Kan fibration such that for each pair of n-simplexes $\sigma, \tau$ with the same boundary, if $\sigma, \tau$ are fiberwise homotopic to each other relative to the boundary, then they are equal: $\sigma = \tau$. In particular, a fiber homotopy equivalence between minimal Kan fibrations is an isomorphism. A minimal Kan fibration is a fiber bundle (in the simplicial sense). Quillen's original approach to establishing the standard model category structure on the category of simplicial sets (as well as more recent accounts) uses minimal Kan fibrations.
