= Aldridge Bousfield =

American mathematician (1941–2020)

Pete (Aldridge) Bousfield
- Born: April 5, 1941; Boston, Massachusetts, United States of America
- Died: October 4, 2020 (aged 79)
- Education: M.I.T.
- Known for: Bousfield localization
- Scientific career
- Fields: Mathematics, Algebraic Topology
- Workplaces: Brandeis University, University of Chicago
- Thesis: Higher Order Suspension Maps for Non-Additive Functors (1966)
- Doctoral advisor: Daniel Kan

Aldridge Knight Bousfield (April 5, 1941 – October 4, 2020), known as "Pete", was an American mathematician working in algebraic topology, known for the concept of Bousfield localization.

== Work and life ==
Bousfield obtained both his undergraduate degree (1963) and his doctorate (1966) at the Massachusetts Institute of Technology. His doctoral thesis, entitled "Higher Order Suspension Maps for Non-Additive Functors", was written under the supervision of Daniel Kan. He was a lecturer and assistant professor at Brandeis University and moved to the University of Illinois at Chicago where he worked from 1972 to his retirement in 2000.

Bousfield married Marie Vastersavendts, a Belgian mathematician, in 1968. She worked as demographer for the city of Chicago and died in 2016.

== Research ==
Within algebraic topology, he specialised in homotopy theory. The Bousfield-Kan spectral sequence, Bousfield localization of spectra and model categories, and the Bousfield-Friedlander model structure are named after Bousfield (and Kan and Friedlander, respectively).

== Recognition ==
He was named to the 2018 class of fellows of the American Mathematical Society "for contributions to homotopy theory and for exposition".

== Selected publications ==
- Bousfield, Aldridge K.; Kan, Daniel M. (1972), Homotopy Limits, Completions and Localizations, Lecture Notes in Mathematics, vol. 304, Springer-Verlag, doi:10.1007/978-3-540-38117-4, ISBN 978-3-540-06105-2
- Bousfield, Aldridge K.; Kan, Daniel M. (1972), "The homotopy spectral sequence of a space with coefficients in a ring", Topology, 11 (1): 79–106, doi:10.1016/0040-9383(72)90024-9
- Bousfield, Aldridge K.; Kan, Daniel M. (1973), "Pairings and products in the homotopy spectral sequence", Transactions of the American Mathematical Society, 177: 319–343, doi:10.1090/S0002-9947-1973-0372860-2
- Bousfield, Aldridge K. (1977), "Homological Localization Towers for Groups and $\Pi$-Modules", Memoirs of the American Mathematical Society, 10 (186), doi:10.1090/memo/0186, MR 0447375
- Bousfield, Aldridge K.; Friedlander, Eric M. (1978), "Homotopy theory of $\Gamma$-spaces, spectra, and bisimplicial sets", Geometric Applications of Homotopy Theory II, Lecture Notes in Mathematics, vol. 658, Springer-Verlag, pp. 80–130, doi:10.1007/BFb0068711, ISBN 978-3-540-08859-2
- Bousfield, Aldridge K. (1979), "The localization of spectra with respect to homology", Topology, 18 (4): 257–281, doi:10.1016/0040-9383(79)90018-1
- Bousfield, Aldridge K. (1989), "Homotopy Spectral Sequences and Obstructions", Israel Journal of Mathematics, 66 (1–3): 54–104, doi:10.1007/BF02765886
