= William Gerard Dwyer =

American mathematician

- Born: 1947 (age 78–79); Jersey City, New Jersey, US
- Education: Massachusetts Institute of Technology
- Scientific career
- Fields: Mathematics
- Workplaces: University of Notre Dame
- Thesis: Strong Convergence of the Eilenberg-Moore Spectral Sequence (1973)
- Doctoral advisor: Daniel Marinus Kan
- Doctoral students: Julie Bergner

William Gerard Dwyer (born 1947) is an American mathematician specializing in algebraic topology and group theory. For many years he was a professor at the University of Notre Dame, where he is the William J. Hank Family Professor Emeritus.

== Life ==
He was born in 1947 in Jersey City, New Jersey.

== Career ==
Dwyer completed his B.A. at Boston College in 1969.

He completed his Ph.D. at the Massachusetts Institute of Technology in 1973. His doctoral thesis was on Strong Convergence of the Eilenberg-Moore Spectral Sequence and his doctoral advisor was Daniel Kan. Afterwards he taught at Yale University and visited the Institute for Advanced Study in Princeton, New Jersey before joining the faculty at the University of Notre Dame.

In 1998 Dwyer was an invited speaker at the International Congress of Mathematicians in Berlin. In 2007 he was awarded a Doctor Honoris Causa degree by the University of Warsaw. He was elected a Fellow of the American Mathematical Society in 2012. He is currently emeritus professor of mathematics at the University of Notre Dame.

== Publications ==
- Dwyer, William G. (1975), "Exotic convergence of the Eilenberg–Moore spectral sequence", Illinois Journal of Mathematics, 19 (4): 607–617, doi:10.1215/ijm/1256050669, ISSN 0019-2082, MR 0383409
- Dwyer, William G.; Wilkerson, Clarence W. (1994), "Homotopy fixed-point methods for Lie groups and finite loop spaces", Annals of Mathematics, 2, 139 (2): 395–442, doi:10.2307/2946585, JSTOR 2946585, MR 1274096
- Dwyer, William G.; Spaliński, Jan (1995), "Homotopy theories and model categories", Handbook of algebraic topology, Amsterdam: North-Holland, pp. 73–126, doi:10.1016/B978-044481779-2/50003-1, ISBN 978-0-444-81779-2, MR 1361887
