= Cocycle category =

Category-theoretic construction

In category theory, a branch of mathematics, the cocycle category of objects X, Y in a model category is a category in which the objects are pairs of maps $X \overset{f}\leftarrow Z \overset{g}\rightarrow Y$ and the morphisms are obvious commutative diagrams between them. It is denoted by $H(X, Y)$. (It may also be defined using the language of 2-categories.)

One has that if the model category is right proper and is such that weak equivalences are closed under finite products, then

$$\pi_0 H(X, Y) \to [X, Y], \quad (f, g) \mapsto g \circ f^{-1}$$

is bijective.
