= Daniel Kan =

Mathematician, prolific contributor to homotopy theory

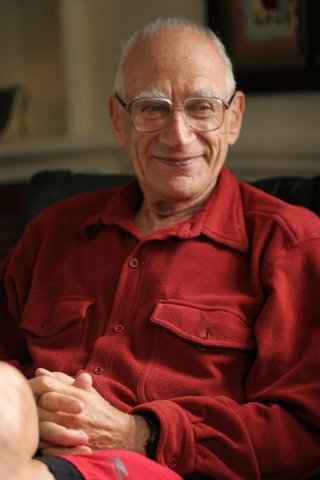
- Daniel Kan at his home in 2005.
- Born: 4 August 1927; Amsterdam, Netherlands
- Died: 4 August 2013 (aged 86)
- Education: Hebrew University of Jerusalem
- Known for: Kan extension Kan fibration Kan–Quillen model structure Kan–Thurston theorem Dold–Kan correspondence
- Scientific career
- Fields: Mathematics
- Workplaces: Massachusetts Institute of Technology
- Thesis: Abstract Homotopy (1955)
- Doctoral advisor: Samuel Eilenberg
- Doctoral students: Aldridge Bousfield; William Gerard Dwyer; Stewart Priddy; Jeffrey H. Smith

Daniel Marinus Kan (or simply Dan Kan) (August 4, 1927 – August 4, 2013) was a Dutch mathematician working in category theory and homotopy theory. He was a prolific contributor to both fields for six decades, having authored or coauthored several dozen research papers and monographs.

== Career ==
Daniel Kan was born into a Jewish family. During World War II, Kan and his family were interned at the Bergen-Belsen concentration camp. Although the family survived the internment, his parents died of dysentery shortly after the camp's liberation, leaving Kan orphaned. He received his Ph.D. at Hebrew University in 1955, under the direction of Samuel Eilenberg. His students include Aldridge K. Bousfield, William Dwyer, Stewart Priddy, Emmanuel Dror Farjoun, and Jeffrey H. Smith. He was an emeritus professor at the Massachusetts Institute of Technology where he taught from 1959, formally retiring in 1993.

== Work ==
He played a role in the beginnings of modern homotopy theory similar to that of Saunders Mac Lane in homological algebra, namely the adroit and persistent application of categorical methods. His most famous work is the abstract formulation of the discovery of adjoint functors, which dates from 1958. The Kan extension is one of the broadest descriptions of a useful general class of adjunctions.

From the mid-1950s he made distinguished contributions to the theory of simplicial sets and simplicial methods in topology in general. In recognition of this, the usual closed model category structure on the category of simplicial sets is known as Kan–Quillen model structure, while its fibrations and fibrant objects are known as Kan fibrations and Kan complexes respectively.

Some of Kan's later work concerned model categories and other homotopical categories. Especially noteworthy are his work with Aldridge Bousfield on completions and homotopy limits, and his work with William Dwyer on simplicial localizations of relative categories.

== See also ==
- Dold–Kan correspondence
- Kan extension
