= Join (category theory) =

Construction for categories

In category theory in mathematics, the join of categories is an operation making the category of small categories into a monoidal category. In particular, it takes two small categories to construct another small category. Under the nerve construction, it corresponds to the join of simplicial sets.

== Definition ==
For small categories $\mathcal{C}$ and $\mathcal{D}$, their join $\mathcal{C}\star\mathcal{D}$ is the small category with:

$$\operatorname{Ob}(\mathcal{C}\star\mathcal{D})
=\operatorname{Ob}(\mathcal{C})\sqcup\operatorname{Ob}(\mathcal{D});$$
$$\operatorname{Hom}_{\mathcal{C}\star\mathcal{D}}(X,Y)
:=\begin{cases}
\operatorname{Hom}_{\mathcal{C}}(X,Y);
& X,Y\in\operatorname{Ob}(\mathcal{C}) \\
\operatorname{Hom}_{\mathcal{D}}(X,Y);
& X,Y\in\operatorname{Ob}(\mathcal{D}) \\
\{*\};
& X\in\operatorname{Ob}(\mathcal{C}), Y\in\operatorname{Ob}(\mathcal{D}) \\
\emptyset;
& X\in\operatorname{Ob}(\mathcal{D}), Y\in\operatorname{Ob}(\mathcal{C})
\end{cases}.$$

The join defines a functor $-\star-\colon \mathbf{Cat}\times\mathbf{Cat}\rightarrow \mathbf{Cat}$, which together with the empty category as unit element makes the category of small categories $\mathbf{Cat}$ into a monoidal category.

For a small category $\mathcal{C}$, one further defines its left cone and right cone as:

$$\mathcal{C}^\triangleleft
:=[0]\star\mathcal{C},$$
$$\mathcal{C}^\triangleright
:=\mathcal{C}\star[0].$$

== Right adjoints ==
Let $\mathcal{D}$ be a small category. The functor $\mathcal{D}\star-\colon \mathbf{Cat}\rightarrow \mathcal{D}\backslash\mathbf{Cat}, \mathcal{D}\mapsto(\mathcal{C}\mapsto\mathcal{D}\star\mathcal{C})$ has a right adjoint $\mathcal{D}\backslash\mathbf{sSet}\rightarrow\mathbf{sSet}, (F\colon\mathcal{D}\rightarrow\mathcal{E})\mapsto F\backslash\mathcal{E}$ (alternatively denoted $\mathcal{D}\backslash\mathcal{E}$) and the functor $-\star\mathcal{D}\colon \mathbf{Cat}\rightarrow \mathcal{D}\backslash\mathbf{Cat}, \mathcal{D}\mapsto(\mathcal{C}\mapsto\mathcal{C}\star\mathcal{D})$ also has a right adjoint $\mathcal{D}\backslash\mathbf{sSet}\rightarrow\mathbf{sSet}, (F\colon\mathcal{D}\rightarrow\mathcal{E})\mapsto\mathcal{E}/F$ (alternatively denoted $\mathcal{E}/\mathcal{D}$). A special case is $\mathcal{D}=[0]$ the terminal small category, since $\mathbf{Cat}_* =[0]\backslash\mathbf{Cat}$ is the category of pointed small categories.

== Properties ==
- The join is associative. For small categories $\mathcal{C}$, $\mathcal{D}$ and $\mathcal{E}$, one has:
  $$(\mathcal{C}\star\mathcal{D})\star\mathcal{E}
\cong\mathcal{C}\star(\mathcal{D}\star\mathcal{E}).$$
- The join reverses under the dual category. For small categories $\mathcal{C}$ and $\mathcal{D}$, one has:
  $$(\mathcal{C}\star\mathcal{D})^\mathrm{op}
\cong\mathcal{C}^\mathrm{op}\star\mathcal{D}^\mathrm{op}.$$
- Under the nerve, the join of categories becomes the join of simplicial sets. For small categories $\mathcal{C}$ and $\mathcal{D}$, one has:
  $$N(\mathcal{C}\star\mathcal{D})
\cong N\mathcal{C}*N\mathcal{D}.$$

== Literature ==
- Joyal, André (2008). "The Theory of Quasi-Categories and its Applications" (PDF).
