= Stable model category =

In category theory, a branch of mathematics, a stable model category is a pointed model category in which the suspension functor is an equivalence of the homotopy category with itself.

The prototypical examples are the category of spectra in the stable homotopy theory and the category of chain complex of R-modules. On the other hand, the category of pointed topological spaces and the category of pointed simplicial sets are not stable model categories.

Any stable model category is equivalent to a category of presheaves of spectra.
