= Kan–Thurston theorem =

In mathematics, particularly algebraic topology, the Kan–Thurston theorem associates a discrete group $G$ to every path-connected topological space $X$ in such a way that the group cohomology of $G$ is the same as the cohomology of the space $X$. The group $G$ might then be regarded as a good approximation to the space $X$, and consequently the theorem is sometimes interpreted to mean that homotopy theory can be viewed as part of group theory.

More precisely, the theorem states that every path-connected topological space is homology-equivalent to the classifying space $K(G,1)$ of a discrete group $G$, where homology-equivalent means there is a map $K(G,1) \rightarrow X$ inducing an isomorphism on homology.

The theorem is attributed to Daniel Kan and William Thurston who published their result in 1976.

== Statement of the Kan–Thurston theorem ==
Let $X$ be a path-connected topological space. Then, naturally associated to $X$, there is a Serre fibration $t_x \colon T_X \to X$ where $T_X$ is an aspherical space. Furthermore,

- the induced map $\pi_1(T_X) \to \pi_1(X)$ is surjective, and
- for every local coefficient system $A$ on $X$, the maps $H_*(TX;A) \to H_*(X;A)$ and $H^*(TX;A) \to H^*(X;A)$ induced by $t_x$ are isomorphisms.
