= Julie Bergner =

Mathematician

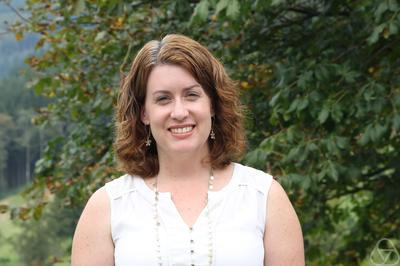
- At the Mathematical Research Institute of Oberwolfach as US Junior Oberwolfach Fellow, 2014
- Education: Gonzaga University; University of Notre Dame
- Known for: Bergner model structure
- Awards: Ruth I. Michler Memorial Prize
- Scientific career
- Fields: Mathematics, algebraic topology
- Workplaces: University of California, Riverside; University of Virginia
- Thesis: Three Models for the Homotopy Theory of Homotopy Theories (2005)
- Doctoral advisor: William Gerard Dwyer

Julia Elizabeth Bergner is a mathematician specializing in algebraic topology, homotopy theory, and higher category theory. She is a professor of mathematics at the University of Virginia.

== Education and career ==
Bergner graduated from Gonzaga University in 2000. She completed her Ph.D. at the University of Notre Dame in 2005. Her dissertation, Three Models for the Homotopy Theory of Homotopy Theories, was supervised by William Gerard Dwyer.

After postdoctoral research at Kansas State University, she joined the mathematics faculty at the University of California, Riverside in 2008. She moved from there to the University of Virginia in 2016.

== Selected publications ==
Bergner is the author of the book The homotopy theory of (∞,1)-categories (London Mathematical Society Student Texts 90, Cambridge University Press, 2018).

Her other publications include:

- Bergner, Julia E. (2007), "A model category structure on the category of simplicial categories", Transactions of the American Mathematical Society, 359 (5): 2043–2058, arXiv:math/0406507, doi:10.1090/S0002-9947-06-03987-0, MR 2276611
- Bergner, Julia E. (2007), "Three models for the homotopy theory of homotopy theories", Topology, 46 (4): 397–436, arXiv:math/0504334, doi:10.1016/j.top.2007.03.002, MR 2321038, S2CID 13886300
- Bergner, Julia E. (2010), "A survey of (∞,1)-categories", in Baez, John C.; May, J. Peter (eds.), Towards Higher Categories, IMA Volumes in Mathematics and its Applications, vol. 152, New York: Springer, pp. 69–83, doi:10.1007/978-1-4419-1524-5_2, ISBN 978-1-4419-1523-8, MR 2664620

== Recognition ==
In 2018, the Association for Women in Mathematics gave Bergner the Ruth I. Michler Memorial Prize for her research on algebraic K-theory. She was named as a Fellow of the American Mathematical Society, in its 2027 class of fellows.
