= Subdivision (simplicial complex) =

A subdivision (also called refinement) of a simplicial complex is another simplicial complex in which, intuitively, one or more simplices of the original complex have been partitioned into smaller simplices. The most commonly used subdivision is the barycentric subdivision, but the term is more general. The subdivision is defined in slightly different ways in different contexts.

== In geometric simplicial complexes ==
Let K be a geometric simplicial complex (GSC). A subdivision of K is a GSC L such that:

- |K| = |L|, that is, the union of simplices in K equals the union of simplices in L (they cover the same region in space).
- each simplex of L is contained in some simplex of K.

As an example, let K be a GSC containing a single triangle {A,B,C} (with all its faces and vertices). Let D be a point on the face AB. Let L be the complex containing the two triangles {A,D,C} and {B,D,C} (with all their faces and vertices). Then L is a subdivision of K, since the two triangles {A,D,C} and {B,D,C} are both contained in {A,B,C}, and similarly the faces {A,D}, {D,B} are contained in the face {A,B}, and the face {D,C} is contained in {A,B,C}.

=== Subdivision by starring ===
One way to obtain a subdivision of K is to pick an arbitrary point x in |K|, remove each simplex s in K that contains x, and replace it with the closure of the following set of simplices:

$\{ x\star t | t ~\text{ is a face of } s \text{ and } x\not\in t \}$

where $x\star t$ is the join of the point x and the face t. This process is called starring at x.

A stellar subdivision is a subdivision obtained by sequentially starring at different points.

A derived subdivision is a subdivision obtained by the following inductive process.

- Star each 1-dimensional simplex (a segment) at some internal point;
- Star each 2-dimensional simplex at some internal point, over the subdivision of the 1-dimensional simplices;
- ... Star each k-dimensional simplex at some internal point, over the subdivision of the (k-1)-dimensional simplices.

The barycentric subdivision is a derived subdivision where the points used for starring are always barycenters of simplices. For example, if D, E, F, G are the barycenters of {A,B}, {A,C}, {B,C}, {A,B,C} respectively, then the first barycentric subdivision of {A,B,C} is the closure of {A,D,G}, {B,D,G}, {A,E,G}, {C,E,G}, {B,F,G}, {C,F,G}.

Iterated subdivisions can be used to attain arbitrarily fine triangulations of a given polyhedron.

An important open problem asks whether any two simplicial complexes with the same underlying space have a common iterated stellar subdivision. This is known as Alexander's conjecture.

== In abstract simplicial complexes ==
Let K be an abstract simplicial complex (ASC). The face poset of K is a poset made of all nonempty simplices of K, ordered by inclusion (which is a partial order). For example, the face-poset of the closure of {A,B,C} is the poset with the following chains:

- {A} < {A,B} < {A,B,C}
- {A} < {A,C} < {A,B,C}
- {B} < {A,B} < {A,B,C}
- {B} < {B,C} < {A,B,C}
- {C} < {A,C} < {A,B,C}
- {C} < {B,C} < {A,B,C}

The order complex of a poset P is an ASC whose vertices are the elements of P and whose simplices are the chains of P.

The first barycentric subdivision of an ASC K is the order complex of its face poset. The order complex of the above poset is the closure of the following simplices:

- { {A} , {A,B} , {A,B,C} }
- { {A} , {A,C} , {A,B,C} }
- { {B} , {A,B} , {A,B,C} }
- { {B} , {B,C} , {A,B,C} }
- { {C} , {A,C} , {A,B,C} }
- { {C} , {B,C} , {A,B,C} }

Note that this ASC is isomorphic to the ASC {A,D,G}, {B,D,G}, {A,E,G}, {C,E,G}, {B,F,G}, {C,F,G}, with the assignment: A={A}, B={B}, C={C}, D={A,B}, E={A,C}, F={B,C}, G={A,B,C}.

The geometric realization of the subdivision of K is always homeomorphic to the geometric realization of K.

== See also ==
- Subdivision (simplicial set)
