= Factorization system =

Category theory generalization of fumction factorization

In mathematics, it can be shown that every function can be written as the composite of a surjective function followed by an injective function. Factorization systems are a generalization of this situation in category theory.

== Definition ==
A factorization system (E, M) for a category C consists of two classes of morphisms E and M of C such that:

1. E and M both contain all isomorphisms of C and are closed under composition.
2. Every morphism f of C can be factored as $f=m\circ e$ for some morphisms $e\in E$ and $m\in M$.
3. The factorization is functorial: if $u$ and $v$ are two morphisms such that $vme=m'e'u$ for some morphisms $e, e'\in E$ and $m, m'\in M$, then there exists a unique morphism $w$ making the following diagram commute:

Remark: $(u,v)$ is a morphism from $me$ to $m'e'$ in the arrow category.

== Orthogonality ==
Two morphisms $e$ and $m$ are said to be orthogonal, denoted $e\downarrow m$, if for every pair of morphisms $u$ and $v$ such that $ve=mu$ there is a unique morphism $w$ such that the diagram

commutes. This notion can be extended to define the orthogonals of sets of morphisms by

$H^\uparrow=\{e\quad|\quad\forall h\in H, e\downarrow h\}$ and $H^\downarrow=\{m\quad|\quad\forall h\in H, h\downarrow m\}.$

Since in a factorization system $E\cap M$ contains all the isomorphisms, the condition (3) of the definition is equivalent to

(3') $E\subseteq M^\uparrow$ and $M\subseteq E^\downarrow.$

Proof: In the previous diagram (3), take $m:= id ,\ e' := id$ (identity on the appropriate object) and $m' := m$.

== Equivalent definition ==
The pair $(E,M)$ of classes of morphisms of C is a factorization system if and only if it satisfies the following conditions:

1. Every morphism f of C can be factored as $f=m\circ e$ with $e\in E$ and $m\in M.$
2. $E=M^\uparrow$ and $M=E^\downarrow.$

== Weak factorization systems ==
Suppose e and m are two morphisms in a category C. Then e has the left lifting property with respect to m (respectively m has the right lifting property with respect to e) when for every pair of morphisms u and v such that ve = mu there is a morphism w such that the following diagram commutes. The difference with orthogonality is that w is not necessarily unique.

A weak factorization system (E, M) for a category C consists of two classes of morphisms E and M of C such that:

1. The class E is exactly the class of morphisms having the left lifting property with respect to each morphism in M.
2. The class M is exactly the class of morphisms having the right lifting property with respect to each morphism in E.
3. Every morphism f of C can be factored as $f=m\circ e$ for some morphisms $e\in E$ and $m\in M$.

This notion leads to a succinct definition of model categories: a model category is a pair consisting of a category C and classes of (so-called) weak equivalences W, fibrations F and cofibrations C so that

- C has all limits and colimits,
- $(C \cap W, F)$ is a weak factorization system,
- $(C, F \cap W)$ is a weak factorization system, and
- $W$ satisfies the two-out-of-three property: if $f$ and $g$ are composable morphisms and two of $f,g,g\circ f$ are in $W$, then so is the third.

A model category is a complete and cocomplete category equipped with a model structure. A map is called a trivial fibration if it belongs to $F\cap W,$ and it is called a trivial cofibration if it belongs to $C\cap W.$ An object $X$ is called fibrant if the morphism $X\rightarrow 1$ to the terminal object is a fibration, and it is called cofibrant if the morphism $0\rightarrow X$ from the initial object is a cofibration.
