= Twisted diagonal (category theory) =

Construction for categories

In category theory in mathematics, the twisted diagonal of a category (also called the twisted arrow category), which makes the morphisms of a category into the objects of a new category, whose morphisms are then pairs of morphisms connecting domain and codomain with the twist coming from them being in opposite directions. It can be constructed as the category of elements of the Hom functor, which makes the twist come from the fact that it is contravariant in the first entry and covariant in the second entry. It can be generalized to the twisted diagonal of a simplicial set to which it corresponds under the nerve construction.

== Definition ==
For a category $\mathcal{C}$, its twisted diagonal $\operatorname{Tw}(\mathcal{C})$ is a category, whose objects are its arrows:

$$\operatorname{Ob}(\operatorname{Tw}(\mathcal{C}))
=\operatorname{Ar}(\mathcal{C})$$

and for which the morphisms between two such objects $f\colon A\rightarrow B$ and $g\colon X\rightarrow Y$ are the pairs $p\colon X\rightarrow A$ and $q\colon B\rightarrow Y$ of morphisms in $\mathcal{C}$ so that $g=q\circ f\circ p$, then we get a commutative diagram

If $[1]$ denotes the category $0\rightarrow 1$ with two objects and one non-trivial morphism (with the notation taken from the simplex category), then the twisted arrow category $\operatorname{Tw}(\mathcal{C})$ is not the functor category $\mathbf{Fun}([1],\mathcal{C})$ since the morphisms between the domains is reversed. An alternative definition is as the category of elements of the Hom functor:

$$\operatorname{Tw}(\mathcal{C})
:=\operatorname{El}(\operatorname{Hom}_\mathcal{C}).$$

There is a canonical functor:

$$\operatorname{Tw}(\mathcal{C})\rightarrow\mathcal{C}^\mathrm{op}\times\mathcal{C},(f\colon X\rightarrow Y)\mapsto(X,Y).$$

== Properties ==
- Under the nerve, the twisted diagonal of categories corresponds to the twisted diagonal of simplicial sets. For a category $\mathcal{C}$, one has:
  $$N\operatorname{Tw}(\mathcal{C})
=\operatorname{Tw}(N\mathcal{C}).$$
- Slice and coslice categories arise through pullbacks from the twisted arrow category. For a category $\mathcal{C}$, one has:
  $$X\backslash\mathcal{C}
\cong\{X\}\times_{\mathcal{C}^\mathrm{op}}\operatorname{Tw}(\mathcal{C}),$$
  $$\mathcal{C}/X
\cong\operatorname{Tw}(\mathcal{C})\times_\mathcal{C}\{X\}.$$
