= Opposite category =

Mathematical category formed by reversing morphisms

In category theory, a branch of mathematics, the opposite category or dual category $C^{\text{op}}$ of a given category $C$ is formed by reversing the morphisms, i.e. interchanging the source and target of each morphism. Doing the reversal twice yields the original category, so the opposite of an opposite category is the original category itself. In symbols, $(C^{\text{op}})^{\text{op}} = C$. The construction can be generalized to ∞-categories using the opposite simplicial set.

== Examples ==
- An example comes from reversing the direction of inequalities in a partial order. So if X is a set and ≤ a partial order relation, we can define a new partial order relation ≤^{op} by

x ≤^{op} y if and only if y ≤ x.

The new order is commonly called dual order of ≤, and is mostly denoted by ≥. Therefore, duality plays an important role in order theory and every purely order theoretic concept has a dual. For example, there are opposite pairs child/parent, descendant/ancestor, infimum/supremum, down-set/up-set, ideal/filter etc. This order theoretic duality is in turn a special case of the construction of opposite categories as every ordered set can be understood as a category.

- Given a semigroup (S, ·), one usually defines the opposite semigroup as (S, ·)^{op} = (S, *) where x*y ≔ y·x for all x,y in S. So also for semigroups there is a strong duality principle. Clearly, the same construction works for groups, as well, and is known in ring theory, too, where it is applied to the multiplicative semigroup of the ring to give the opposite ring. Again this process can be described by completing a semigroup to a monoid, taking the corresponding opposite category, and then possibly removing the unit from that monoid.
- The category of Boolean algebras and Boolean homomorphisms is equivalent to the opposite of the category of Stone spaces and continuous functions.
- The category of affine schemes is equivalent to the opposite of the category of commutative rings.
- The Pontryagin duality restricts to an equivalence between the category of compact Hausdorff abelian topological groups and the opposite of the category of (discrete) abelian groups.
- By the Gelfand–Naimark theorem, the category of localizable measurable spaces (with measurable maps) is equivalent to the category of commutative Von Neumann algebras (with normal unital homomorphisms of *-algebras).

== Properties ==
Opposite preserves products:

$(C\times D)^{\text{op}} \cong C^{\text{op}}\times D^{\text{op}}$ (see product category)

Opposite preserves functors:

$(\mathrm{Funct}(C,D))^{\text{op}} \cong \mathrm{Funct}(C^{\text{op}},D^{\text{op}})$ (see functor category, opposite functor)

Opposite preserves slices:

$(F\downarrow G)^{\text{op}} \cong (G^{\text{op}}\downarrow F^{\text{op}})$ (see comma category)

== See also ==
- Dual object
- Dual (category theory)
- Duality (mathematics)
- Adjoint functor
- Contravariant functor
- Opposite functor
