= Rick Jardine =

Canadian mathematician

John Frederick "Rick" Jardine (born December 6, 1951, in Belleville, Canada) is a Canadian mathematician working in the fields of homotopy theory, category theory, and number theory.

== Biography ==
Jardine obtained his Ph.D. from the University of British Columbia in 1981, with thesis Algebraic Homotopy written under the direction of Roy Douglas. Following a research fellowship at the University of Toronto and a Dickson instructorship at the University of Chicago, he joined the Department of Mathematics at the University of Western Ontario in 1984, where he is currently an emeritus professor.

From 2002 to 2016, Jardine held a Canada Research Chair in applied homotopy theory. Since 2008, he is fellow of the Fields Institute, and has been recognized with the Coxeter–James Prize in 1992 by the Canadian Mathematical Society. In 2018 the Canadian Mathematical Society listed him in their inaugural class of fellows.
