= Kan fibration =

Map between simplicial sets with lifting property

In mathematics, Kan complexes and Kan fibrations are part of the theory of simplicial sets. Kan fibrations are the fibrations of the standard model category structure on simplicial sets and are therefore of fundamental importance. Kan complexes are the fibrant objects in this model category. The name is in honor of Daniel Kan.

For various kinds of fibrations for simplicial sets, see Fibration of simplicial sets.

== Definitions ==
=== Definition of the standard n-simplex ===
The striped blue simplex in the domain has to exist in order for this map to be a Kan fibration

For each n ≥ 0, recall that the standard $n$-simplex, $\Delta^n$, is the representable simplicial set

$$\Delta^n(i) = \mathrm{Hom}_{\mathbf{\Delta}} ([i], [n])$$

Applying the geometric realization functor to this simplicial set gives a space homeomorphic to the topological standard $n$-simplex: the convex subspace of $\mathbb{R}^{n+1}$ consisting of all points $(t_0,\dots,t_n)$ such that the coordinates are non-negative and sum to 1.

=== Definition of a horn ===
For each k ≤ n, this has a subcomplex $\Lambda^n_k$, the k-th horn inside $\Delta^n$, corresponding to the boundary of the n-simplex, with the k-th face removed. This may be formally defined in various ways, as for instance the union of the images of the n maps $\Delta^{n-1} \rightarrow \Delta^n$ corresponding to all the other faces of $\Delta^n$. Horns of the form $\Lambda_k^2$ sitting inside $\Delta^2$ look like the black V at the top of the adjacent image. If $X$ is a simplicial set, then maps

$$s: \Lambda_k^n \to X$$

correspond to collections of $n$ $(n-1)$-simplices satisfying a compatibility condition, one for each $0 \leq k \leq n$. Explicitly, this condition can be written as follows. Write the $(n-1)$-simplices as a list $(s_0,\dots,s_{k-1},s_{k+1},\dots,s_{n})$ and require that

$d_i s_j = d_{j-1} s_i\,$ for all $i < j$ with $i,j \neq k$.

These conditions are satisfied for the $(n-1)$-simplices of $\Lambda_k^n$ sitting inside $\Delta^n$.

=== Definition of a Kan fibration ===
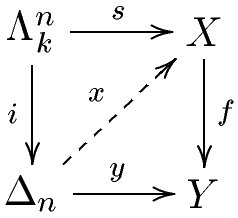
Lifting diagram for a Kan fibration

A map of simplicial sets $f: X\rightarrow Y$ is a Kan fibration if, for any $n\ge 1$ and $0\le k\le n$, and for any maps $s:\Lambda^n_k\rightarrow X$ and $y:\Delta^n\rightarrow Y\,$ such that $f \circ s=y \circ i$ (where $i$ is the inclusion of $\Lambda^n_k$ in $\Delta^n$), there exists a map $x:\Delta^n \rightarrow X$ such that $s=x \circ i$ and $y=f \circ x$. Stated this way, the definition is very similar to that of fibrations in topology (see also homotopy lifting property), whence the name "fibration".

==== Technical remarks ====
Using the correspondence between $n$-simplices of a simplicial set $X$ and morphisms $\Delta^n \to X$ (a consequence of the Yoneda lemma), this definition can be written in terms of simplices. The image of the map $fs: \Lambda_k^n \to Y$ can be thought of as a horn as described above. Asking that $fs$ factors through $yi$ corresponds to requiring that there is an $n$-simplex in $Y$ whose faces make up the horn from $fs$ (together with one other face). Then the required map $x: \Delta^n\to X$ corresponds to a simplex in $X$ whose faces include the horn from $s$. The diagram to the right is an example in two dimensions. Since the black V in the lower diagram is filled in by the blue $2$-simplex, if the black V above maps down to it then the striped blue $2$-simplex has to exist, along with the dotted blue $1$-simplex, mapping down in the obvious way.

==== Kan complexes defined from Kan fibrations ====
A simplicial set $X$ is called a Kan complex if the map from $X \to \{*\}$, the one-point simplicial set, is a Kan fibration. In the model category for simplicial sets, $\{*\}$ is the terminal object and so a Kan complex is exactly the same as a fibrant object. Equivalently, this could be stated as: if every map $\alpha: \Lambda^n_k \to X$ from a horn has an extension to $\Delta^n$, meaning there is a lift $\tilde{\alpha}: \Delta^n \to X$ such that

$\alpha = \tilde{\alpha}\circ \iota$

for the inclusion map $\iota: \Lambda^n_k \hookrightarrow \Delta^n$, then $X$ is a Kan complex. Conversely, every Kan complex has this property, hence it gives a simple technical condition for a Kan complex.

== Examples ==
=== Simplicial sets from singular homology ===
An important example comes from the construction of singular simplices used to define singular homology, called the singular functor^{pg 7}

$S: \text{Top} \to s\text{Sets}$.

Given a space $X$, define a singular $n$-simplex of X to be a continuous map from the standard topological $n$-simplex (as described above) to $X$,

$$f: \Delta_n \to X$$

Taking the set of these maps for all non-negative $n$ gives a graded set,

$$S(X) = \coprod_n S_n(X)$$.

To make this into a simplicial set, define face maps $d_i: S_n(X)\to S_{n-1}(X)$ by

$$(d_i f)(t_0,\dots,t_{n-1}) = f(t_0,\dots,t_{i-1},0,t_i,\dots,t_{n-1})\,$$

and degeneracy maps $s_i: S_n(X)\to S_{n+1}(X)$ by

$$(s_i f)(t_0,\dots,t_{n+1}) = f(t_0,\dots,t_{i-1},t_i + t_{i+1},t_{i+2},\dots,t_{n+1})\,$$.

Since the union of any $n+1$ faces of $\Delta_{n+1}$ is a strong deformation retract of $\Delta_{n+1}$, any continuous function defined on these faces can be extended to $\Delta_{n+1}$, which shows that $S(X)$ is a Kan complex.

==== Relation with geometric realization ====
It is worth noting the singular functor is right adjoint to the geometric realization functor

$|\cdot|:s\text{Sets} \to \text{Top}$

giving the isomorphism

$\text{Hom}_{\text{Top}}(|X|,Y) \cong \text{Hom}_{s\text{Sets}}(X,S(Y))$

See also: Milnor's theorem on Kan complexes.

=== Simplicial sets underlying simplicial groups ===
It can be shown that the simplicial set underlying a simplicial group is always fibrant^{pg 12}. In particular, for a simplicial abelian group, its geometric realization is homotopy equivalent to a product of Eilenberg-Maclane spaces

$\prod_{i \in I} K(A_i,n_i)$

In particular, this includes classifying spaces. So the spaces $S^1 \simeq K(\mathbb{Z},1)$, $\mathbb{CP}^\infty \simeq K(\mathbb{Z},2)$, and the infinite lens spaces $L^\infty_q \simeq K(\mathbb{Z}/q, 2)$ are correspond to Kan complexes of some simplicial set. In fact, this set can be constructed explicitly using the Dold–Kan correspondence of a chain complex and taking the underlying simplicial set of the simplicial abelian group.

=== Geometric realizations of small groupoids ===
Another important source of examples are the simplicial sets associated to a small groupoid $\mathcal{G}$. This is defined as the geometric realization of the simplicial set $[\Delta^{op},\mathcal{G}]$ and is typically denoted $B\mathcal{G}$. We could have also replaced $\mathcal{G}$ with an infinity groupoid. It is conjectured that the homotopy category of geometric realizations of infinity groupoids is equivalent to the homotopy category of homotopy types. This is called the homotopy hypothesis.

=== Mapping space ===
Let $X$ be an ∞-category. Then for each object $x, y$, let $\operatorname{Map}_X(x, y)$ be the fiber of $(s, t) : \underline{\operatorname{Hom}}(\Delta^1, X) \to X^2$ over the point $(x, y)$. Then $\operatorname{Map}_X(x, y)$ is a Kan complex.

=== Postnikov section ===
Let X be a Kan complex. Then the n-th Postnikov section $P_n X$ is a simplicial set such that $P_n X_m$ is the coequalizer of $X_m \rightrightarrows \operatorname{cosk}_n X_m$. Then the following can be verified directly:

- $P_n X$ is a Kan complex and $X \to P_nX$ is a Kan fibration.
- The induced map $\pi_i X \to \pi_i P_n X$ is an isomorphism for $i = 0$ and for each $0 < i \le n$ and choice of a base point on X.
- $\pi_i X = 0$ for each $i > n$ and choice of a base point on X.

For a simplicial set X, we then let $P_n X = P_n \operatorname{Ex}^{\infty} X$ where $\operatorname{Ex}^{\infty}$ is an Ex∞ functor.

=== Non-example: standard n-simplex ===
It turns out the standard $n$-simplex $\Delta^n$ is not a Kan complex^{pg 38}. The construction of a counter example in general can be found by looking at a low dimensional example, say $\Delta^1$. Taking the map $\Lambda_0^2 \to \Delta^1$ sending

$$\begin{matrix}
[0,2] \mapsto [0,0] &
[0,1] \mapsto [0,1]
\end{matrix}$$

gives a counter example since it cannot be extended to a map $\Delta^2 \to \Delta^1$ because the maps have to be order preserving. If there was a map, it would have to send

$$\begin{align}
0 \mapsto 0 \\
1 \mapsto 1 \\
2 \mapsto 0
\end{align}$$

but this isn't a map of simplicial sets.

== Categorical properties ==
=== Simplicial enrichment and function complexes ===
For simplicial sets $X,Y$ there is an associated simplicial set called the function complex $\textbf{Hom}(X,Y)$, where the simplices are defined as

$\textbf{Hom}_n(X,Y) = \text{Hom}_{s\text{Sets}}(X\times\Delta^n, Y)$

and for an ordinal map $\theta : [m] \to [n]$ there is an induced map

$\theta^*: \textbf{Hom}(X,Y)_n \to \textbf{Hom}(X,Y)_m$

(since the first factor of Hom is contravariant) defined by sending a map $f:X\times\Delta^n \to Y$ to the composition

$X\times\Delta^m \xrightarrow{1\times \theta}X\times\Delta^n \xrightarrow{f} Y$

==== Exponential law ====
This complex has the following exponential law of simplicial sets

$\text{ev}_*:\text{Hom}_{s\text{Sets}}(K, \textbf{Hom}(X,Y)) \to \text{Hom}_{s\text{Sets}}(X\times K, Y)$

which sends a map $f: K \to \textbf{Hom}(X,Y)$ to the composite map

$X\times K \xrightarrow{1\times g}X\times\textbf{Hom}(X,Y) \xrightarrow{ev} Y$

where $ev(x,f) = f(x,\iota_n)$ for $\iota_n \in \text{Hom}_\Delta([n],[n])$ lifted to the n-simplex $\Delta^n$.

=== Kan fibrations and pull-backs ===
Given a (Kan) fibration $p:X \to Y$ and an inclusion of simplicial sets $i: K \hookrightarrow L$, there is a fibration ^{pg 21}

$\textbf{Hom}(L,X) \xrightarrow{(i^*,p_*)}\textbf{Hom}(K,X)\times_{\textbf{Hom}(K,Y)}\textbf{Hom}(L, Y)$

(where $\textbf{Hom}$ is in the function complex in the category of simplicial sets) induced from the commutative diagram

$$\begin{matrix}
\textbf{Hom}(L,X) & \xrightarrow{p_*} & \textbf{Hom}(L,Y) \\
i^* \downarrow & & \downarrow i^* \\
\textbf{Hom}(K,X) & \xrightarrow{p_*} & \textbf{Hom}(K,Y)
\end{matrix}$$

where $i^*$ is the pull-back map given by pre-composition and $p_*$ is the pushforward map given by post-composition. In particular, the previous fibration implies $p_*:\textbf{Hom}(L,X) \to \textbf{Hom}(L,Y)$ and $i^*:\textbf{Hom}(L,Y) \to \textbf{Hom}(K,Y)$ are fibrations.

The above is a consequence of a theorem of Gabriel and Zisman.

== Homotopy groups of Kan complexes ==
The homotopy groups of a fibrant simplicial set may be defined combinatorially, using horns, in a way that agrees with the homotopy groups of the topological space which realizes it. For a Kan complex $X$ and a vertex $x:\Delta^0 \to X$, as a set $\pi_n(X,x)$ is defined as the set of maps $\alpha:\Delta^n \to X$ of simplicial sets fitting into a certain commutative diagram:

$$\pi_n(X,x) =
\left\{
\alpha: \Delta^n \to X :
\begin{matrix}
\Delta^n & \overset{\alpha}{\to} & X \\
\uparrow & & \uparrow x \\
\partial \Delta^n & \to & \Delta^0
\end{matrix} \right\}$$

Notice the fact $\partial\Delta^n$ is mapped to a point is equivalent to the definition of the sphere $S^n$ as the quotient $B^n / \partial B^n$ for the standard unit ball

$B^n = \{x \in \mathbb{R}^n : ||x||_{eu} \leq 1 \}$

Defining the group structure requires a little more work. Essentially, given two maps $\alpha,\beta:\Delta^n \to X$ there is an associated $(n+1)$-simplice $\omega:\Delta^{n+1} \to X$ such that $d_n\omega:\Delta^n \to X$ gives their addition. This map is well-defined up to simplicial homotopy classes of maps, giving the group structure. Moreover, the groups $\pi_n(X,x)$ are Abelian for $n \geq 2$. For $\pi_0(X)$, it is defined as the homotopy classes $[x ]$ of vertex maps $x:\Delta^0 \to X$.

=== Homotopy groups of simplicial sets ===
Using model categories, any simplicial set $X$ has a fibrant replacement $\hat{X}$ which is homotopy equivalent to $X$ in the homotopy category of simplicial sets. Then, the homotopy groups of $X$ can be defined as

$\pi_n(X,x) := \pi_n(\hat{X},\hat{x})$

where $\hat{x}$ is a lift of $x:\Delta^0 \to X$ to $\hat{X}$. These fibrant replacements can be thought of a topological analogue of resolutions of a chain complex (such as a projective resolution or a flat resolution).

== Kan ==
Kan complexes themselves form a weak Kan complex called Kan. Namely, first consider the category K where objects are Kan complexes and morphisms maps of simplicial sets. As a category of presheaves has internal Hom, each hom-set in K has a structure of a simplicial set; in short, K is a simplicial category. The homotopy coherent nerve of it

$$\textbf{Kan} := N^{hc}(K)$$

is then a weak Kan complex (∞-category). In view of homotopy hypothesis, it is often taken as the ∞-category of spaces = ∞-groupoids and is also denoted as $\mathsf{S}$ or some other variants.

See also: universal left fibration.

== See also ==
- Simplicial homotopy theory
- Simplicially enriched category
- Weak Kan complex (also called quasi-category, ∞-category)
- ∞-groupoid
- Minimal fibration
