= Lifting property =

Concept category theory (mathematics)

In mathematics, in particular in category theory, the lifting property is a property of a pair of morphisms in a category. It is used in homotopy theory within algebraic topology to define properties of morphisms starting from an explicitly given class of morphisms. It appears in a prominent way in the theory of model categories, an axiomatic framework for homotopy theory introduced by Daniel Quillen. It is also used in the definition of a factorization system, and of a weak factorization system, notions related to but less restrictive than the notion of a model category. Several elementary notions may also be expressed using the lifting property starting from a list of (counter)examples.

== Formal definition ==
A morphism $i$ in a category has the left lifting property with respect to a morphism $p$, and $p$ also has the right lifting property with respect to $i$, sometimes denoted $i\perp p$ or $i\downarrow p$, iff the following implication holds for each morphism $f$ and $g$ in the category:

- if the outer square of the following diagram commutes, then there exists $h$ completing the diagram, i.e. for each $f:A\to X$ and $g:B\to Y$ such that $p\circ f = g \circ i$ there exists $h:B\to X$ such that $h\circ i = f$ and $p\circ h = g$.

This is sometimes also known as the morphism $i$ being orthogonal to the morphism $p$; however, this can also refer to the stronger property that whenever $f$ and $g$ are as above, the diagonal morphism $h$ exists and is also required to be unique.

For a class $C$ of morphisms in a category, its left orthogonal $C^{\perp \ell}$ or $C^\perp$ with respect to the lifting property, respectively its right orthogonal $C^{\perp r}$ or ${}^\perp C$, is the class of all morphisms which have the left, respectively right, lifting property with respect to each morphism in the class $C$. In notation,

$$\begin{align}
C^{\perp\ell} &:= \{ i \mid \forall p\in C, i\perp p\} \\
C^{\perp r} &:= \{ p \mid \forall i\in C, i\perp p\}
\end{align}$$

== Properties ==
Taking the orthogonal of a class $C$ is a simple way to define a class of morphisms excluding non-isomorphisms from $C$, in a way which is useful in a diagram chasing computation.

In the category Set of sets, the right orthogonal $\{\emptyset \to \{*\}\}^{\perp r}$ of the simplest non-surjection $\emptyset\to \{*\}$ is the class of surjections. The left and right orthogonals of $\{x_1,x_2\}\to \{*\},$ the simplest non-injection, are both precisely the class of injections,

$$\{\{x_1,x_2\}\to \{*\}\}^{\perp\ell} = \{\{x_1,x_2\}\to \{*\}\}^{\perp r} = \{ f \mid f \text{ is an injection } \}.$$

It is clear that $C^{\perp\ell r} \supset C$ and $C^{\perp r\ell} \supset C$. The class $C^{\perp r}$ is always closed under retracts (that is, if $X$ and $Y$ are objects, $C \perp Y$, and $X$ is a retract of $Y$, then $C \perp X$), pullbacks, (small) products (whenever they exist in the category) & composition of morphisms, and contains all isomorphisms (that is, invertible morphisms) of the underlying category. Meanwhile, $C^{\perp \ell}$ is closed under retracts, pushouts, (small) coproducts & transfinite composition (filtered colimits) of morphisms (whenever they exist in the category), and also contains all isomorphisms.

Let $i$, $j$, and $k$ be morphisms such that $i \circ j$ exists. Then:

- If $i \circ j \perp k$ and $j$ is an epimorphism, then $i \perp k$.
- If $k \perp i \circ j$ and $i$ is a monomorphism, then $k \perp j$.

These two properties are useful when the category is equipped with a weak factorisation system consisting of epimorphisms and monomorphisms.

== Examples ==
A number of notions can be defined by passing to the left or right orthogonal several times starting from a list of explicit examples, i.e., as $C^{\perp\ell}, C^{\perp r}, C^{\perp\ell r}, C^{\perp\ell\ell}$, etc., where $C$ is a given class of morphisms. A useful intuition is to think that the left and right lifting properties against a class $C$ are a way of expressing a negation of some property of the morphisms in $C$. In this vein, performing a "double negation" can be seen as a kind of "closure" or "completion" procedure.

=== Elementary examples in various categories ===
==== In Set ====
Let $1$ denote any fixed singleton set, such as $\{0\}$, and let $2$ denote any fixed set with two elements, such as $\{0,1\}$.

- If $i : 1 \to 2$ denotes either of the two functions from $1$ to $2$, then $\{i\}^{\perp l} = \{i\}^{\perp r}$ is the class of surjections.
- If $j: 2 \to 1$ is the unique function from $2$ to $1$, then $\{j\}^{\perp r} = \{j\}^{\perp l}$ is the class of injections.

==== In the category of modules over a commutative ring R ====
Let $0$ denote the zero module and for each $R$-module $M$, let $0 \to M$ and $M \to 0$ denote the two unique morphisms between $0$ and $M$.

- $\{0\to R\}^{\perp r}$ is the class of surjective module homomorphisms.
- $\{R\to 0\}^{\perp r}$ is the class of injective module homomorphisms.
- A module $M$ is projective if and only if $0\to M$ is in $\{0\to R\}^{\perp rl}$.
- A module $M$ is injective if and only if $M\to 0$ is in $\{R\to 0\}^{\perp rr}$.

==== In the category of groups ====
Let $\Z$ denote the infinite cyclic group of integers under addition.

- $\{0\to \Z\}^{\perp r}$ is the class of surjective group homomorphisms.
- $\{\Z \to 0\}^{\perp r}$ is the class of injective group homomorphisms.
- A group $F$ is a free group if and only if $0\to F$ is in $\{0\to \Z \}^{\perp rl}$.
- A group $A$ is torsion-free if and only if $0\to A$ is in $\{ n \Z\to \Z : n>0 \}^{\perp r}$.
- A subgroup $A$ of a group $B$ is pure if and only if $A \to B$ is in $\{ n\Z\to \Z : n>0 \}^{\perp r}$.

For a finite group $G$,

- $\{0\to {\Z}/p{\Z}\} \perp 1\to G$ iff the order of $G$ is prime to $p$ iff $\{{\Z}/p{\Z} \to 0\} \perp G\to 1$.
- $G\to 1 \in (0\to {\Z}/p{\Z})^{\perp rr}$ iff $G$ is a $p$-group.
- $H$ is nilpotent iff the diagonal map $H\to H\times H$ is in $(1\to *)^{\perp\ell r}$ where $(1\to *)$ denotes the class of maps $\{ 1\to G : G \text{ arbitrary}\}$.
- a finite group $H$ is soluble iff $1\to H$ is in
  $$\{0\to A : A\text{ abelian}\}^{\perp\ell r}=\{[G,G]\to G : G\text{ arbitrary } \}^{\perp\ell r}.$$

==== In the category of topological spaces ====
Let $\{0,1\}$ and $\{0\leftrightarrow 1\}$ denote a two-element set with the discrete topology and the indiscrete topology, respectively. Let $\{0\to 1\}$ denote the Sierpinski space of two points, in which the set $\{0\}$ is open (and not closed) and the set $\{1\}$ is closed (and not open), and let $\{0\}\to \{0\to 1\}, \{1\} \to \{0\to 1\}$, etc. denote the obvious embeddings.

- A space $X$ is a T_{0} space if and only if $X\to \{*\}$ is in $(\{0\leftrightarrow 1\} \to \{*\})^{\perp r}$.
- A space $X$ is a T_{1} space if and only if $\emptyset\to X$ is in $( \{0\to 1\}\to \{*\})^{\perp r}$.
- $(\{1\}\to \{0\to 1\})^{\perp l}$ is the class of maps with dense image.
- $(\{0\to 1\}\to \{*\})^{\perp\ell}$ is the class of maps $f:X\to Y$ such that the topology on $A$ is the pullback of topology on $B$, i.e. the topology on $A$ is the topology with least number of open sets such that the map is continuous,
- $(\emptyset\to \{*\})^{\perp r}$ is the class of surjective maps,
- $(\emptyset\to \{*\})^{\perp r\ell}$ is the class of maps of form $A\to A\cup D$ where $D$ is discrete,
- $(\emptyset\to \{*\})^{\perp r\ell\ell} = (\{a\}\to \{a,b\})^{\perp\ell}$ is the class of maps $A\to B$ such that each connected component of $B$ intersects $\operatorname{Im} A$,
- $(\{0,1\}\to \{*\})^{\perp r}$ is the class of injective maps,
- $(\{0,1\}\to \{*\})^{\perp\ell}$ is the class of maps $f:X\to Y$ such that the preimage of a connected closed open subset of $Y$ is a connected closed open subset of $X$, e.g. $X$ is connected iff $X\to \{*\}$ is in $(\{0,1\} \to \{*\})^{\perp\ell}$,
- for a connected space $X$, each continuous function on $X$ is bounded iff $\emptyset\to X \perp \cup_n (-n,n) \to \R$ where $\cup_n (-n,n) \to \R$ is the map from the disjoint union of open intervals $(-n,n)$ into the real line $\mathbb{R},$
- a space $X$ is Hausdorff iff for any injective map $\{a,b\}\hookrightarrow X$, it holds $\{a,b\}\hookrightarrow X \perp \{a\to x \leftarrow b \}\to\{*\}$ where $\{a\leftarrow x\to b \}$ denotes the three-point space with two open points $a$ and $b$, and a closed point $x$,
- a space $X$ is perfectly normal iff $\emptyset\to X \perp [0,1] \to \{0\leftarrow x\to 1\}$ where the open interval $(0,1)$ goes to $x$, and $0$ maps to the point $0$, and $1$ maps to the point $1$, and $\{0\leftarrow x\to 1\}$ denotes the three-point space with two closed points $0, 1$ and one open point $x$.

==== In the category of metric spaces with uniformly continuous maps ====
- A space $X$ is complete iff $\{1/n\}_{n \in \N} \to \{0\}\cup \{1/n\}_{n \in \N} \perp X\to \{0\}$ where $\{1/n\}_{n \in \N} \to \{0\}\cup \{1/n\}_{n \in \N}$ is the obvious inclusion between the two subspaces of the real line with induced metric, and $\{0\}$ is the metric space consisting of a single point,
- A subspace $i:A\to X$ is closed iff $\{1/n\}_{n \in \N} \to \{0\}\cup \{1/n\}_{n \in \N} \perp A\to X.$

=== Examples of lifting properties in algebraic topology ===
A map $f:U\to B$ has the path lifting property iff $\{0\}\to [0,1] \perp f$ where $\{0\} \to [0,1]$ is the inclusion of one end point of the closed interval into the interval $[0,1]$.

A map $f:U\to B$ has the homotopy lifting property iff $X \to X\times [0,1] \perp f$ where $X\to X\times [0,1]$ is the map $x \mapsto (x,0)$.

=== Examples of lifting properties coming from model categories ===
Fibrations and cofibrations.

- Let Top be the category of topological spaces, and let $C_0$ be the class of maps $S^n\to D^{n+1}$, embeddings of the boundary $S^n=\partial D^{n+1}$ of a ball into the ball $D^{n+1}$. Let $WC_0$ be the class of maps embedding the upper semi-sphere into the disk. $WC_0^{\perp\ell}, WC_0^{\perp\ell r}, C_0^{\perp\ell}, C_0^{\perp\ell r}$ are the classes of fibrations, acyclic cofibrations, acyclic fibrations, and cofibrations.
- Let sSet be the category of simplicial sets. Let $C_0$ be the class of boundary inclusions $\partial \Delta[n] \to \Delta[n]$, and let $WC_0$ be the class of horn inclusions $\Lambda^i[n] \to \Delta[n]$. Then the classes of fibrations, acyclic cofibrations, acyclic fibrations, and cofibrations are, respectively, $WC_0^{\perp\ell}, WC_0^{\perp\ell r}, C_0^{\perp\ell}, C_0^{\perp\ell r}$.
- Let $\mathbf{Ch}(R)$ be the category of chain complexes over a commutative ring $R$. Let $C_0$ be the class of maps of form

$$\cdots\to 0\to R \to 0 \to 0 \to \cdots \to \cdots \to R \xrightarrow{\operatorname{id}} R \to 0 \to 0 \to \cdots,$$

and $WC_0$ be

$$\cdots \to 0\to 0 \to 0 \to 0 \to \cdots \to \cdots \to R \xrightarrow{\operatorname{id}} R \to 0 \to 0 \to \cdots.$$

Then $WC_0^{\perp\ell}, WC_0^{\perp\ell r}, C_0^{\perp\ell}, C_0^{\perp\ell r}$ are the classes of fibrations, acyclic cofibrations, acyclic fibrations, and cofibrations.
