= Quillen adjunction =

Special kind of adjunction between categories named after Daniel Quillen

In homotopy theory, a branch of mathematics, a Quillen adjunction between two closed model categories $\mathbf C$ and $\mathbf D$ is a special kind of adjunction between categories that induces an adjunction between the homotopy categories $\text{Ho}(\mathbf C)$ and $\text{Ho}(\mathbf D)$ via the total derived functor construction. Quillen adjunctions are named in honor of the mathematician Daniel Quillen.

== Formal definition ==
Given two closed model categories $\mathbf C$ and $\mathbf D$, a Quillen adjunction is a pair

$$(F,G):\mathbf{C} \rightleftarrows \mathbf{D}$$

of adjoint functors with $F$ left adjoint to $G$ such that $F$ preserves cofibrations and trivial cofibrations or, equivalently by the closed model axioms, such that $G$ preserves fibrations and trivial fibrations. In such an adjunction, $F$ is called the left Quillen functor and $G$ is called the right Quillen functor.

== Properties ==
It is a consequence of the axioms that a left (right) Quillen functor preserves weak equivalences between cofibrant (fibrant) objects. The total derived functor theorem of Quillen says that the total left derived functor

$$\mathbf{L}F:\operatorname{Ho}(\mathbf{C})\rightarrow\operatorname{Ho}(\mathbf{D})$$

is a left adjoint to the total right derived functor

$$\mathbf RG:\text{Ho}(\mathbf D)\rightarrow\text{Ho}(\mathbf C)$$

This adjunction $(\mathbf LF,\mathbf RG)$ is called the derived adjunction.

If $(F,G)$ is a Quillen adjunction as above such that

$$F(c)\rightarrow d$$

with $c$ cofibrant and $d$ fibrant is a weak equivalence in $\mathbf D$ if and only if

$$c\rightarrow G(d)$$

is a weak equivalence in $\mathbf{C}$ then it is called a Quillen equivalence of the closed model categories $\mathbf C$ and $\mathbf D$. In this case the derived adjunction is an adjoint equivalence of categories so that

$$\mathbf LF(c)\rightarrow d$$

is an isomorphism in $\text{Ho}(\mathbf D)$ if and only if

$$c\rightarrow\mathbf RG(d)$$

is an isomorphism in $\text{Ho}(\mathbf C)$.
