= Higher Topos Theory =

Mathematics text

Higher Topos Theory is a treatise on the theory of ∞-categories written by American mathematician Jacob Lurie. In addition to introducing Lurie's new theory of ∞-topoi, the book is widely considered foundational to higher category theory. Since 2018, Lurie has been transferring the contents of Higher Topos Theory (along with new material) to Kerodon, an "online resource for homotopy-coherent mathematics" inspired by the Stacks Project.

== Topics ==
Higher Topos Theory covers two related topics: ∞-categories and ∞-topoi (which are a special case of the former). The first five of the book's seven chapters comprise a rigorous development of general ∞-category theory in the language of quasicategories, a special class of simplicial set which acts as a model for ∞-categories. The path of this development largely parallels classical category theory, with the notable exception of the ∞-categorical Grothendieck construction; this correspondence, which Lurie refers to as "straightening and unstraightening", gains considerable importance in his treatment.

The last two chapters are devoted to ∞-topoi, Lurie's own invention and the ∞-categorical analogue of topoi in classical category theory. The material of these chapters is original, and is adapted from an earlier preprint of Lurie's. There are also appendices discussing background material on categories, model categories, and simplicial categories.

== History ==
Higher Topos Theory followed an earlier work by Lurie, On Infinity Topoi, uploaded to the arXiv in 2003. Algebraic topologist Peter May was critical of this preprint, emailing Lurie's then-advisor Mike Hopkins "to say that Lurie’s paper had some interesting ideas, but that it felt preliminary and needed more rigor." Lurie released a draft of Higher Topos Theory on the arXiv in 2006, and the book was finally published in 2009.

Lurie released a second book on higher category theory, Higher Algebra, as a preprint on his website in 2017. This book assumes the content of Higher Topos Theory and uses it to study algebra in the ∞-categorical context.
