= Model category =

Mathematical category with weak equivalences, fibrations and cofibrations

In mathematics, particularly in homotopy theory, a model category is a category with distinguished classes of morphisms ('arrows') called 'weak equivalences', 'fibrations' and 'cofibrations' satisfying certain axioms relating them. These abstract from the category of topological spaces or of chain complexes (derived category theory). The concept was introduced by Daniel G. Quillen (1967).

In recent decades, the language of model categories has been used in some parts of algebraic K-theory and algebraic geometry, where homotopy-theoretic approaches led to deep results.

== Motivation ==
Model categories can provide a natural setting for homotopy theory: the category of topological spaces is a model category, with the homotopy corresponding to the usual theory. Similarly, objects that are thought of as spaces often admit a model category structure, such as the category of simplicial sets.

Another model category is the category of chain complexes of R-modules for a commutative ring R. Homotopy theory in this context is homological algebra. Homology can then be viewed as a type of homotopy, allowing generalizations of homology to other objects, such as groups and R-algebras, one of the first major applications of the theory. Because of the above example regarding homology, the study of closed model categories is sometimes thought of as homotopical algebra.

== Formal definition ==
The definition given initially by Quillen was that of a closed model category, the assumptions of which seemed strong at the time, motivating others to weaken some of the assumptions to define a model category. In practice the distinction has not proven significant and most recent authors (e.g., Mark Hovey and Philip Hirschhorn) work with closed model categories and simply drop the adjective 'closed'.

The definition has been separated to that of a model structure on a category and then further categorical conditions on that category, the necessity of which may seem unmotivated at first but becomes important later. The following definition follows that given by Hovey.

A model structure on a category C consists of three distinguished classes of morphisms (equivalently subcategories): weak equivalences, fibrations, and cofibrations, and two functorial factorizations $(\alpha , \beta)$ and $(\gamma, \delta)$ subject to the following axioms. A fibration that is also a weak equivalence is called an acyclic (or trivial) fibration and a cofibration that is also a weak equivalence is called an acyclic (or trivial) cofibration (or sometimes called an anodyne morphism).

Axioms

1. Retracts: if g is a morphism belonging to one of the distinguished classes, and f is a retract of g (as objects in the arrow category $C^2$, where 2 is the 2-element ordered set), then f belongs to the same distinguished class. Explicitly, the requirement that f is a retract of g means that there exist i, j, r, and s, such that the following diagram commutes:
2. 2 of 3: if f and g are maps in C such that gf is defined and any two of these are weak equivalences then so is the third.
3. Lifting: acyclic cofibrations have the left lifting property with respect to fibrations, and cofibrations have the left lifting property with respect to acyclic fibrations. Explicitly, if the outer square of the following diagram commutes, where i is a cofibration and p is a fibration, and i or p is acyclic, then there exists h completing the diagram.
4. Factorization:
  - every morphism f in C can be written as $p\circ i$ for a fibration p and an acyclic cofibration i;
  - every morphism f in C can be written as $p\circ i$ for an acyclic fibration p and a cofibration i.

A model category is a category that has a model structure and all (small) limits and colimits, i.e., a complete and cocomplete category with a model structure.

=== Definition via weak factorization systems ===
The above definition can be succinctly phrased by the following equivalent definition: a model category is a category C and three classes of (so-called) weak equivalences W, fibrations F and cofibrations C so that

- C has all limits and colimits,
- $(C \cap W, F)$ is a weak factorization system,
- $(C, F \cap W)$ is a weak factorization system
- $W$ satisfies the 2 of 3 property.

=== First consequences of the definition ===
The axioms imply that any two of the three classes of maps determine the third (e.g., cofibrations and weak equivalences determine fibrations).

Also, the definition is self-dual: if C is a model category, then its opposite category $\mathcal{C}^{op}$ also admits a model structure so that weak equivalences correspond to their opposites, fibrations opposites of cofibrations and cofibrations opposites of fibrations.

== Examples ==
=== Topological spaces ===
The category of topological spaces, Top, admits a standard model category structure with the usual (Serre) fibrations and with weak equivalences as weak homotopy equivalences. The cofibrations are not the usual notion found here, but rather the narrower class of maps that have the left lifting property with respect to the acyclic Serre fibrations. Equivalently, they are the retracts of the relative cell complexes, as explained for example in Hovey's Model Categories. This structure is not unique; in general there can be many model category structures on a given category. For the category of topological spaces, another such structure is given by Hurewicz fibrations and standard cofibrations, and the weak equivalences are the (strong) homotopy equivalences.

=== Chain complexes ===
The category of (nonnegatively graded) chain complexes of R-modules carries at least two model structures, which both feature prominently in homological algebra:

- weak equivalences are maps that induce isomorphisms in homology;
- cofibrations are maps that are monomorphisms in each degree with projective cokernel; and
- fibrations are maps that are epimorphisms in each nonzero degree

or

- weak equivalences are maps that induce isomorphisms in homology;
- fibrations are maps that are epimorphisms in each degree with injective kernel; and
- cofibrations are maps that are monomorphisms in each nonzero degree.

This explains why Ext-groups of R-modules can be computed by either resolving the source projectively or the target injectively. These are cofibrant or fibrant replacements in the respective model structures.

The category of arbitrary chain-complexes of R-modules has a model structure that is defined by

- weak equivalences are chain homotopy equivalences of chain-complexes;
- cofibrations are monomorphisms that are split as morphisms of underlying R-modules; and
- fibrations are epimorphisms that are split as morphisms of underlying R-modules.

=== Further examples ===
Other examples of categories admitting model structures include the category of all small categories, the category of simplicial sets or simplicial presheaves on any small Grothendieck site, the category of topological spectra, and the categories of simplicial spectra or presheaves of simplicial spectra on a small Grothendieck site.

Simplicial objects in a category are a frequent source of model categories; for instance, simplicial commutative rings or simplicial R-modules admit natural model structures. This follows because there is an adjunction between simplicial sets and simplicial commutative rings (given by the forgetful and free functors), and in nice cases one can lift model structures under an adjunction.

A simplicial model category is a simplicial category with a model structure that is compatible with the simplicial structure.

Given any category C and a model category M, under certain extra hypothesis the category of functors Fun (C, M) (also called C-diagrams in M) is also a model category. In fact, there are always two candidates for distinct model structures: in one, the so-called projective model structure, fibrations and weak equivalences are those maps of functors which are fibrations and weak equivalences when evaluated at each object of C. Dually, the injective model structure is similar with cofibrations and weak equivalences instead. In both cases the third class of morphisms is given by a lifting condition (see below). In some cases, when the category C is a Reedy category, there is a third model structure lying in between the projective and injective.

The process of forcing certain maps to become weak equivalences in a new model category structure on the same underlying category is known as Bousfield localization. For example, the category of simplicial sheaves can be obtained as a Bousfield localization of the model category of simplicial presheaves.

Denis-Charles Cisinski has developed a general theory of model structures on presheaf categories (generalizing simplicial sets, which are presheaves on the simplex category).

If C is a model category, then so is the category Pro(C) of pro-objects in C. However, a model structure on Pro(C) can also be constructed by imposing a weaker set of axioms to C.

== Some constructions ==
Every closed model category has a terminal object by completeness and an initial object by cocompleteness, since these objects are the limit and colimit, respectively, of the empty diagram. Given an object X in the model category, if the unique map from the initial object to X is a cofibration, then X is said to be cofibrant. Analogously, if the unique map from X to the terminal object is a fibration then X is said to be fibrant.

If Z and X are objects of a model category such that Z is cofibrant and there is a weak equivalence from Z to X then Z is said to be a cofibrant replacement for X. Similarly, if Z is fibrant and there is a weak equivalence from X to Z then Z is said to be a fibrant replacement for X. In general, not all objects are fibrant or cofibrant, though this is sometimes the case. For example, all objects are cofibrant in the standard model category of simplicial sets and all objects are fibrant for the standard model category structure given above for topological spaces.

Left homotopy is defined with respect to cylinder objects and right homotopy is defined with respect to path space objects. These notions coincide when the domain is cofibrant and the codomain is fibrant. In that case, homotopy defines an equivalence relation on the hom sets in the model category giving rise to homotopy classes.

== Characterizations of fibrations and cofibrations by lifting properties ==
Cofibrations can be characterized as the maps which have the left lifting property with respect to acyclic fibrations, and acyclic cofibrations are characterized as the maps which have the left lifting property with respect to fibrations. Similarly, fibrations can be characterized as the maps which have the right lifting property with respect to acyclic cofibrations, and acyclic fibrations are characterized as the maps which have the right lifting property with respect to cofibrations.

== Homotopy and the homotopy category ==
The homotopy category of a model category C is the localization of C with respect to the class of weak equivalences. This definition of homotopy category does not depend on the choice of fibrations and cofibrations. However, the classes of fibrations and cofibrations are useful in describing the homotopy category in a different way and in particular avoiding set-theoretic issues arising in general localizations of categories. More precisely, the "fundamental theorem of model categories" states that the homotopy category of C is equivalent to the category whose objects are the objects of C which are both fibrant and cofibrant, and whose morphisms are left homotopy classes of maps (equivalently, right homotopy classes of maps) as defined above. (See for instance Model Categories by Hovey, Thm 1.2.10)

Applying this to the category of topological spaces with the model structure given above, the resulting homotopy category is equivalent to the category of CW complexes and homotopy classes of continuous maps, whence the name.

=== Quillen adjunctions ===
A pair of adjoint functors

$$F: C \leftrightarrows D : G$$

between two model categories C and D is called a Quillen adjunction if F preserves cofibrations and acyclic cofibrations or, equivalently by the closed model axioms, such that G preserves fibrations and acyclic fibrations. In this case F and G induce an adjunction

$$LF: Ho(C) \leftrightarrows Ho(D) : RG$$

between the homotopy categories. There is also an explicit criterion for the latter to be an equivalence (F and G are called a Quillen equivalence then).

A typical example is the standard adjunction between simplicial sets and topological spaces:

$$|-|: \mathbf{sSet} \leftrightarrows \mathbf{Top} : Sing$$

involving the geometric realization of a simplicial set and the singular chains in some topological space. The categories sSet and Top are not equivalent, but their homotopy categories are. Therefore, simplicial sets are often used as models for topological spaces because of this equivalence of homotopy categories.

== See also ==
- (∞,1)-category
- Cocycle category
- Stable model category
