= Denis-Charles Cisinski =

Denis-Charles Cisinski (born March 10, 1976) is a mathematician focussing on higher category theory, homotopy theory, K-theory and algebraic geometry. In 2001, Cisinski model structures on topoi were introduced and later named after him. Since 2016, Denis-Charles Cisinski works at the Universität Regensburg.

== Research ==
Denis-Charles Cisinski obtained his PhD in 2002 at the Paris Diderot University with a thesis supervised by Georges Maltsiniotis and titled Les préfaisceaux comme modèles des types d'homotopie (Presheaves as models for homotopy types). It was expanded and released as a book in 2006, further developing the theory from Pursuing Stacks by Alexander Grothendieck. In 2015, Denis-Charles Cisinski gave a talk at the Séminaire Nicolas Bourbaki summarizing the current state of research titled Catégories supérieures et théorie des topos (Higher categories and theory of toposes). Higher Categories and Homotopical Algebra, a mathematical textbook about higher category theory by Denis-Charles Cisinski, was published in 2019.

== Publications ==
=== Books ===
- Cisinski, Denis-Charles (2006). Les préfaisceaux comme modèles des types d'homotopie [Presheaves as models for homotopy types] (PDF). Astérisque. Vol. 308. ISBN 978-2-85629-225-9. MR 2294028.
- Cisinski, Denis-Charles (2019-06-30). Higher Categories and Homotopical Algebra (PDF). Cambridge University Press. ISBN 978-1108473200.
- Cisinski, Denis-Charles; Déglise, Frédéric (2019-09-08). Triangulated Categories of Mixed Motives (PDF). Springer Nature. ISBN 978-3-030-33241-9.

=== Scripts ===
- Cisinski, Denis-Charles (September 2002). "Théories homotopiques dans les topos". Journal of Pure and Applied Algebra (in French). 174 (1): 43–82. doi:10.1016/S0022-4049(01)00176-1.
- Cisinski, Denis-Charles (2015). "Catégories supérieures et théorie des topos" (PDF).
