= Derived algebraic geometry =

Branch of mathematics

Derived algebraic geometry is a branch of mathematics that generalizes algebraic geometry to a situation where commutative rings, which provide local charts, are replaced by either differential graded algebras (over $\mathbb{Q}$), simplicial commutative rings or $E_{\infty}$-ring spectra from algebraic topology, whose higher homotopy groups account for the non-discreteness (e.g., Tor) of the structure sheaf. Grothendieck's scheme theory allows the structure sheaf to carry nilpotent elements. Derived algebraic geometry can be thought of as an extension of this idea, and provides natural settings for intersection theory (or motivic homotopy theory) of singular algebraic varieties and cotangent complexes in deformation theory (cf. J. Francis), among the other applications.

== Introduction ==
Basic objects of study in the field are derived schemes and derived stacks. The often-cited motivation is Serre's intersection formula. In the usual formulation, the formula involves the Tor functor and thus, unless higher Tor vanish, the scheme-theoretic intersection (i.e., fiber product of immersions) does not yield the correct intersection number. In the derived context, one takes the derived tensor product $A \otimes^L B$, whose higher homotopy is higher Tor, whose Spec is not a scheme but a derived scheme. Hence, the "derived" fiber product yields the correct intersection number. See Theorem 3.22 in Khan, where derived intersection theory has been developed.

The term "derived" is used in the same way as derived functor or derived category, in the sense that the category of commutative rings is being replaced with a ∞-category of "derived rings." In classical algebraic geometry, the derived category of quasi-coherent sheaves is viewed as a triangulated category, but it has natural enhancement to a stable ∞-category, which can be thought of as the ∞-categorical analogue of an abelian category.

== Definitions ==
Derived algebraic geometry is fundamentally the study of geometric objects using homological algebra and homotopy. Since objects in this field should encode the homological and homotopy information, there are various notions of what derived spaces encapsulate. The basic objects of study in derived algebraic geometry are derived schemes, and more generally, derived stacks. Heuristically, derived schemes should be functors from some category of derived rings to the category of sets

$$F: \text{DerRings} \to \text{Sets}$$

which can be generalized further to have targets of higher groupoids (which are expected to be modelled by homotopy types). These derived stacks are suitable functors of the form

$$F: \text{DerRings} \to \text{HoT}.$$

Many authors model such functors as functors with values in simplicial sets, since they model homotopy types and are well-studied. Differing definitions on these derived spaces depend on a choice of what the derived rings are, and what the homotopy types should look like. Some examples of derived rings include commutative differential graded algebras, simplicial rings, and $E_\infty$-rings.

=== Derived geometry over characteristic 0 ===
Over characteristic 0 many of the derived geometries agree since the derived rings are the same. $E_\infty$ algebras are just commutative differential graded algebras over characteristic zero. We can then define derived schemes similarly to schemes in algebraic geometry. Similar to algebraic geometry, we could also view these objects as a pair $(X,\mathcal{O}_X^\bullet)$ which is a topological space $X$ with a sheaf of commutative differential graded algebras. Sometimes authors take the convention that these are negatively graded, so $\mathcal{O}_X^{n} = 0$ for $n > 0$. The sheaf condition could also be weakened so that for a cover $U_i$ of $X$, the sheaves $\mathcal{O}_{U_i}^\bullet$ would glue on overlaps $U_{ij}$ only by quasi-isomorphism.

Unfortunately, over characteristic p, differential graded algebras work poorly for homotopy theory, due to the fact $d[x^p] = p d[x^{p-1}]$. This can be overcome by using simplicial algebras.

=== Derived geometry over arbitrary characteristic ===
Derived rings over arbitrary characteristic are taken as simplicial commutative rings because of the nice categorical properties these have. In particular, the category of simplicial rings is simplicially enriched, meaning the hom-sets are themselves simplicial sets. Also, there is a canonical model structure on simplicial commutative rings coming from simplicial sets. In fact, it is a theorem of Quillen's that the model structure on simplicial sets can be transferred over to simplicial commutative rings.

=== Higher stacks ===
It is conjectured there is a final theory of higher stacks which model homotopy types. Grothendieck conjectured these would be modelled by globular groupoids, or a weak form of their definition. Simpson gives a useful definition in the spirit of Grothendieck's ideas. Recall that an algebraic stack (here a 1-stack) is called representable if the fiber product of any two schemes is isomorphic to a scheme. If we take the ansatz that a 0-stack is just an algebraic space and a 1-stack is just a stack, we can recursively define an n-stack as an object such that the fiber product along any two schemes is an (n-1)-stack. If we go back to the definition of an algebraic stack, this new definition agrees.

== Spectral schemes ==
Another theory of derived algebraic geometry is encapsulated by the theory of spectral schemes. Their definition requires a fair amount of technology in order to precisely state. But, in short, spectral schemes $X = (\mathfrak{X},\mathcal{O}_{\mathfrak{X}})$ are given by a spectrally ringed $\infty$-topos $\mathfrak{X}$ together with a sheaf of $\mathbb{E}_\infty$-rings $\mathcal{O}_{\mathfrak{X}}$ on it subject to some locality conditions similar to the definition of affine schemes. In particular

1. $\mathfrak{X} \cong \text{Shv}(X_{top})$ must be equivalent to the $\infty$-topos of some topological space
2. There must exist a cover $U_i$ of $X_{top}$ such that the induced topos $(\mathfrak{X}_{U_i}, \mathcal{O}_{\mathfrak{X}_{U_i}})$ is equivalent to a spectrally ringed topos $\text{Spec}(A_i)$ for some $\mathbb{E}_\infty$-ring $A_i$

Moreover, the spectral scheme $X$ is called connective if $\pi_i(\mathcal{O}_{\mathfrak{X}}) = 0$ for $i < 0$.

=== Examples ===
Recall that the topos of a point $\text{Sh}(*)$ is equivalent to the category of sets. Then, in the $\infty$-topos setting, we instead consider $\infty$-sheaves of $\infty$-groupoids (which are $\infty$-categories with all morphisms invertible), denoted $\text{Shv}(*)$, giving an analogue of the point topos in the $\infty$-topos setting. Then, the structure of a spectrally ringed space can be given by attaching an $\mathbb{E}_\infty$-ring $A$. Notice this implies that spectrally ringed spaces generalize $\mathbb{E}_\infty$-rings since every $\mathbb{E}_\infty$-ring can be associated with a spectrally ringed site.

This spectrally ringed topos can be a spectral scheme if the spectrum of this ring gives an equivalent $\infty$-topos, so its underlying space is a point. For example, this can be given by the ring spectrum $H\mathbb{Q}$, called the Eilenberg–Maclane spectrum, constructed from the Eilenberg–MacLane spaces $K(\mathbb{Q},n)$.

== Applications ==
- Derived algebraic geometry was used by Kerz, Strunk & Tamme (2018) to prove Weibel's conjecture on vanishing of negative K-theory.
- The formulation of the Geometric Langlands conjecture by Arinkin and Gaitsgory uses derived algebraic geometry.

== See also ==
- Derived scheme
- Pursuing Stacks
- Noncommutative algebraic geometry
- Simplicial commutative ring
- Derivator
- Algebra over an operad
- En-ring
- Higher Topos Theory
- ∞-topos
- étale spectrum
