= Gamma-object =

In mathematics, a Γ-object of a pointed category C is a contravariant functor from Γ to C.

The basic example is Segal's so-called Γ-space, which may be thought of as a generalization of simplicial abelian group (or simplicial abelian monoid). More precisely, one can define a Gamma space as an O-monoid object in an infinity-category. The notion plays a role in the generalization of algebraic K-theory that replaces an abelian group by something higher.
