= Simplicial commutative ring =

Commutative monoid in simplicial abelian groups

In algebra, a simplicial commutative ring is a commutative monoid in the category of simplicial abelian groups, or, equivalently, a simplicial object in the category of commutative rings. If A is a simplicial commutative ring, then it can be shown that $\pi_0 A$ is a ring and $\pi_i A$ are modules over that ring (in fact, $\pi_* A$ is a graded ring over $\pi_0 A$.)

A topology-counterpart of this notion is a commutative ring spectrum.

== Examples ==
- The ring of polynomial differential forms on simplexes.

== Graded ring structure ==
Let A be a simplicial commutative ring. Then the ring structure of A gives $\pi_* A = \oplus_{i \ge 0} \pi_i A$ the structure of a graded-commutative graded ring as follows.

By the Dold–Kan correspondence, $\pi_* A$ is the homology of the chain complex corresponding to A; in particular, it is a graded abelian group. Next, to multiply two elements, writing $S^1$ for the simplicial circle, let $x:(S^1)^{\wedge i} \to A, \, \, y:(S^1)^{\wedge j} \to A$ be two maps. Then the composition

$$(S^1)^{\wedge i} \times (S^1)^{\wedge j} \to A \times A \to A$$,

the second map the multiplication of A, induces $(S^1)^{\wedge i} \wedge (S^1)^{\wedge j} \to A$. This in turn gives an element in $\pi_{i + j} A$. We have thus defined the graded multiplication $\pi_i A \times \pi_j A \to \pi_{i + j} A$. It is associative because the smash product is. It is graded-commutative (i.e., $xy = (-1)^{|x||y|} yx$) since the involution $S^1 \wedge S^1 \to S^1 \wedge S^1$ introduces a minus sign.

If M is a simplicial module over A (that is, M is a simplicial abelian group with an action of A), then the similar argument shows that $\pi_* M$ has the structure of a graded module over $\pi_* A$ (cf. Module spectrum).

== Spec ==
By definition, the category of affine derived schemes is the opposite category of the category of simplicial commutative rings; an object corresponding to A will be denoted by $\operatorname{Spec} A$.

== See also ==
- E_n-ring
