= Derived scheme =

In algebraic geometry, a derived scheme is a homotopy-theoretic generalization of a scheme in which classical commutative rings are replaced with derived versions such as differential graded algebras, commutative simplicial rings, or commutative ring spectra.

From the functor of points point-of-view, a derived scheme is a sheaf X on the category of simplicial commutative rings which admits an open affine covering $\{Spec(A_i) \to X\}$.

From the locally ringed space point-of-view, a derived scheme is a pair $(X, \mathcal{O})$ consisting of a topological space X and a sheaf $\mathcal{O}$ either of simplicial commutative rings or of commutative ring spectra on X such that (1) the pair $(X, \pi_0 \mathcal{O})$ is a scheme and (2) $\pi_k \mathcal{O}$ is a quasi-coherent $\pi_0 \mathcal{O}$-module.

A derived stack is a stacky generalization of a derived scheme.

== Differential graded scheme ==
Over a field of characteristic zero, the theory is closely related to that of a differential graded scheme. By definition, a differential graded scheme is obtained by gluing affine differential graded schemes, with respect to étale topology. It was introduced by Maxim Kontsevich "as the first approach to derived algebraic geometry" and was developed further by Mikhail Kapranov and Ionut Ciocan-Fontanine.

=== Connection with differential graded rings and examples ===
Just as affine algebraic geometry is equivalent (in categorical sense) to the theory of commutative rings (commonly called commutative algebra), affine derived algebraic geometry over characteristic zero is equivalent to the theory of commutative differential graded rings. One of the main example of derived schemes comes from the derived intersection of subschemes of a scheme, giving the Koszul complex. For example, let $f_1, \ldots, f_k \in \Complex[x_1,\ldots, x_n] = R$, then we can get a derived scheme

$$(X,\mathcal{O}_\bullet) = \mathbf{RSpec} \left (R/(f_1) \otimes_R^\mathbf{L} \cdots \otimes_R^\mathbf{L} R/(f_k) \right )$$

where

$$\textbf{RSpec}:(\textbf{dga}_\Complex)^{op} \to \textbf{DerSch}$$

is the étale spectrum. Since we can construct a resolution

$$\begin{matrix}
0 \to & R & \xrightarrow{\cdot f_i} & R &\to 0 \\
&\downarrow&&\downarrow& \\
0\to &0& \to&R/(f_i) & \to 0
\end{matrix}$$

the derived ring $R/(f_1) \otimes_R^\mathbf{L} \cdots \otimes_R^\mathbf{L} R/(f_k)$, a derived tensor product, is the Koszul complex $K_R(f_1,\ldots, f_k)$. The truncation of this derived scheme to amplitude $[-1,0]$ provides a classical model motivating derived algebraic geometry. Notice that if we have a projective scheme

$$\operatorname{Proj}\left( \frac{\Z[x_0,\ldots,x_n]}{(f_1,\ldots, f_k)} \right)$$

where $\deg(f_i) = d_i$ we can construct the derived scheme $(\mathbb{P}^n, \mathcal{E}^\bullet,(f_1,\ldots, f_k))$ where

$$\mathcal{E}^\bullet = [\mathcal{O}(-d_1)\oplus\cdots\oplus\mathcal{O}(-d_k) \xrightarrow{(\cdot f_1,\ldots,\cdot f_k)} \mathcal{O}]$$

with amplitude $[-1,0]$.

== Cotangent complex ==
=== Construction ===
Let $(A_\bullet,d)$ be a fixed differential graded algebra defined over a field of characteristic $0$. Then a $A_\bullet$-differential graded algebra $(R_\bullet,d_R)$ is called semi-free if the following conditions hold:

1. The underlying graded algebra $R_\bullet$ is a polynomial algebra over $A_\bullet$, meaning it is isomorphic to $A_\bullet[\{x_i \}_{i \in I}]$
2. There exists a filtration $\varnothing = I_0 \subseteq I_1 \subseteq \cdots$ on the indexing set $I$ where $\textstyle\bigcup_{n \in \N} I_n = I$ and $d_R(x_i) \in A_\bullet[\{x_j\}_{j \in I_n}]$ for any $x_i \in I_{n+1}$.

It turns out that every $A_\bullet$-differential graded algebra admits a surjective quasi-isomorphism from a semi-free $(A_\bullet,d)$ differential graded algebra, called a semi-free resolution. These are unique up to homotopy equivalence in a suitable model category. The (relative) cotangent complex of an $(A_\bullet,d)$-differential graded algebra $(B_\bullet, d_B)$ can be constructed using a semi-free resolution $(R_\bullet,d_R) \to (B_\bullet, d_B)$: it is defined as

$$\mathbb{L}_{B_\bullet/A_\bullet} := \Omega_{R_\bullet/A_\bullet}\otimes_{R_\bullet} B_\bullet.$$

Many examples can be constructed by taking the algebra $B$ representing a variety over a field of characteristic 0, finding a presentation of $R$ as a quotient of a polynomial algebra and taking the Koszul complex associated to this presentation. The Koszul complex acts as a semi-free resolution of the differential graded algebra $(B_\bullet,0)$ where $B_\bullet$ is the graded algebra with the non-trivial graded piece in degree 0.

=== Examples ===
The cotangent complex of a hypersurface $X = \mathbb{V}(f) \subset \mathbb{A}^n_\Complex$ can easily be computed: since we have the dga $K_R(f)$ representing the derived enhancement of $X$, we can compute the cotangent complex as

$$0 \to R\cdot ds \xrightarrow{\Phi} \bigoplus_i R \cdot dx_i \to 0$$

where $\Phi(gds) = g\cdot df$ and $d$ is the usual universal derivation. If we take a complete intersection, then the Koszul complex

$$R^\bullet = \frac{\Complex[x_1,\ldots,x_n]}{(f_1)} \otimes^\mathbf{L}_{\Complex[x_1,\ldots,x_n]} \cdots \otimes^\mathbf{L}_{\Complex[x_1, \ldots, x_n]} \frac{\Complex[x_1,\ldots,x_n]}{(f_k)}$$

is quasi-isomorphic to the complex

$$\frac{\Complex[x_1,\ldots,x_n]}{(f_1,\ldots,f_k)}[+0].$$

This implies we can construct the cotangent complex of the derived ring $R^\bullet$ as the tensor product of the cotangent complex above for each $f_i$.

=== Remarks ===
Please note that the cotangent complex in the context of derived geometry differs from the cotangent complex of classical schemes. Namely, if there was a singularity in the hypersurface defined by $f$ then the cotangent complex would have infinite amplitude. These observations provide motivation for the hidden smoothness philosophy of derived geometry since we are now working with a complex of finite length.

== Tangent complexes ==
=== Polynomial functions ===
Given a polynomial function $f:\mathbb{A}^n \to \mathbb{A}^m,$ then consider the (homotopy) pullback diagram

$$\begin{matrix}
Z & \to & \mathbb{A}^n \\
\downarrow & & \downarrow f \\
\{ pt \} & \xrightarrow{0} & \mathbb{A}^m
\end{matrix}$$

where the bottom arrow is the inclusion of a point at the origin. Then, the derived scheme $Z$ has tangent complex at $x\in Z$ is given by the morphism

$$\mathbf{T}_x = T_x\mathbb{A}^n \xrightarrow{df_x} T_0\mathbb{A}^m$$

where the complex is of amplitude $[-1,0]$. Notice that the tangent space can be recovered using $H^0$ and the $H^{-1}$ measures how far away $x \in Z$ is from being a smooth point.

=== Stack quotients ===
Given a stack $[X/G]$ there is a nice description for the tangent complex:

$$\mathbf{T}_x = \mathfrak{g}_x \to T_xX .$$

If the morphism is not injective, the $H^{-1}$ measures again how singular the space is. In addition, the Euler characteristic of this complex yields the correct (virtual) dimension of the quotient stack. In particular, if we look at the moduli stack of principal $G$-bundles, then the tangent complex is just $\mathfrak{g}[+1]$.

== Derived schemes in complex Morse theory ==
Derived schemes can be used for analyzing topological properties of affine varieties. For example, consider a smooth affine variety $M \subset \mathbb{A}^n$. If we take a regular function $f:M \to \Complex$ and consider the section of $\Omega_M$

$$\begin{cases} \Gamma_{df}: M \to \Omega_M \\ x \mapsto (x,df(x)) \end{cases}$$

Then, we can take the derived pullback diagram

$$\begin{matrix}
X & \to & M \\
\downarrow & & \downarrow 0 \\
M & \xrightarrow{\Gamma_{df}} & \Omega_M
\end{matrix}$$

where $0$ is the zero section, constructing a derived critical locus of the regular function $f$.

=== Example ===
Consider the affine variety

$$M = \operatorname{Spec} (\Complex[x,y])$$

and the regular function given by $f(x,y) = x^2 + y^3$. Then,

$$\Gamma_{df}(a,b) = (a,b,2a,3b^2)$$

where we treat the last two coordinates as $dx, dy$. The derived critical locus is then the derived scheme

$$\textbf{RSpec}\left( \frac{\Complex[x,y,dx,dy]}{(dx,dy)} \otimes_{\Complex [x,y,dx,dy]}^{\mathbf{L}} \frac{\Complex [x,y,dx,dy]}{(2x - dx, 3y^2 - dy)} \right).$$

Note that since the left term in the derived intersection is a complete intersection, we can compute a complex representing the derived ring as

$$K_{dx,dy}^\bullet(\Complex [x,y,dx,dy])\otimes_{\Complex [x,y,dx,dy]} \frac{\Complex [x,y,dx,dy]}{(2 - dx, 3y^2 - dy)}$$

where $K_{dx,dy}^\bullet(\Complex [x,y,dx,dy])$ is the Koszul complex.

== Derived critical locus ==
Consider a smooth function $f:M \to \Complex$ where $M$ is smooth. The derived enhancement of $\operatorname{Crit}(f)$, the derived critical locus, is given by the differential graded scheme $(M,\mathcal{A}^\bullet, Q)$ where the underlying graded ring are the polyvector fields

$$\mathcal{A}^{-i} = \wedge^i T_M$$

and the differential $Q$ is defined by contraction by $df$.

=== Example ===
For example, if

$$\begin{cases} f:\Complex^2 \to \Complex \\ f(x,y) = x^2 + y^3 \end{cases}$$

we have the complex

$$R\cdot \partial x\wedge \partial y \xrightarrow{2xdx + 3y^2dy} R \cdot \partial x \oplus R \cdot \partial y \xrightarrow{2xdx + 3y^2dy} R$$

representing the derived enhancement of $\operatorname{Crit}(f)$.
