= Higher stack =

In mathematics, especially algebraic geometry and algebraic topology, a higher stack is a higher category generalization of a stack (a category-valued sheaf). The notion goes back to Grothendieck’s Pursuing Stacks.

Toën suggests the following principle:

As 1-stacks appear as soon as objects must be classified up to isomorphism, higher stacks appear as soon as objects must be classified up to a notion of equivalence which is weaker than the notion of isomorphism.

An n-stack is synonymous with an (n+1)-sheaf. ∞-stacks, and ∞-sheaves are thus the same notion.

Sometimes a derived stack (or a spectral stack) is defined as a higher stack of some sort.

== Definition ==
Let $(\mathcal{C}, J)$ be a Grothendieck site (where $\mathcal{C}$is a small 1-category, and J is a class of morphisms in $\mathcal{C}$which are covering sieves).

Let $\text{Fun}(\mathcal{C}^{op}, \mathcal{S})$be the category of presheaves of ∞-groupoids. Let $\{U_i\rightarrow X\}_{i\in I}$be a covering family of an object $X\in \mathcal{C}_0$. From this covering family, we can form a small category $\mathcal{O}: = \{\bigcap_{i\in K}U_i | K\subseteq I\text{ is a finite subset}\}$ of finite intersections which comes with a canonical functor $p:\mathcal{O}\rightarrow \mathcal{C}$. A presheaf $F:\mathcal{C}^{op}\rightarrow \mathcal{S}$is a sheaf if, for every covering family, we have
$$\text{lim}_{\mathcal{O}^{op}}F\circ p^{op}\simeq F(X)$$.

The ∞-category of presheaves satisfying the sheaf condition is a full subcategory of $\text{Fun}(\mathcal{C}^{op}, \mathcal{S})$and the inclusion admits a left adjoint which we may term "stackification".

The stacks on $(\mathcal{C}, J)$can be denoted $\text{Sh}_{\infty}(\mathcal{C}, J)$or just as $\text{Sh}_{\infty}(\mathcal{C})$when the Grothendieck topology is understood.

== Examples ==
When $\mathcal{C} = \textbf{Man}$is the category of manifolds, and J consists of the usual open covers, the above construction gives the category of higher smooth stacks. Choosing J to be the collection of singleton surjective submersions, or of local diffeomorphisms gives the same category of ∞-sheaves.

When $\mathcal{C} = \textbf{CRing}^{op}$is the category of affine schemes, and J is the étale topology, the ∞-category of étale stacks is a more refined version of the usual étale topos. There are other topologies, such as the Zariski topology, or the fpqc and fppf topologies which all give different categories of ∞-sheaves.
