= Polynomial differential form =

In algebra, the ring of polynomial differential forms on the standard n-simplex is the differential graded algebra:

$$\Omega^*_{\text{poly}}([n])= \mathbb{Q}[t_0, ..., t_n, dt_0, ..., dt_n]/(\sum t_i - 1, \sum dt_i).$$

Varying n, it determines the simplicial commutative dg algebra:

$$\Omega^*_{\text{poly}}$$

(each $u: [n] \to [m]$ induces the map $\Omega^*_{\text{poly}}([m]) \to \Omega^*_{\text{poly}}([n]), t_i \mapsto \sum_{u(j)=i} t_j$).
