= Derived tensor product =

In algebra, given a differential graded algebra A over a commutative ring R, the derived tensor product functor is

$$- \otimes_A^{\textbf{L}} - : D(\mathsf{M}_A) \times D({}_A \mathsf{M}) \to D({}_R \mathsf{M})$$

where $\mathsf{M}_A$ and ${}_A \mathsf{M}$ are the categories of right A-modules and left A-modules and D refers to the homotopy category (i.e., derived category). By definition, it is the left derived functor of the tensor product functor $- \otimes_A - : \mathsf{M}_A \times {}_A \mathsf{M} \to {}_R \mathsf{M}$.

== Derived tensor product in derived ring theory ==
If R is an ordinary ring and M, N right and left modules over it, then, regarding them as discrete spectra, one can form the smash product of them:

$$M \otimes_R^L N$$

whose i-th homotopy is the i-th Tor:

$$\pi_i (M \otimes_R^L N) = \operatorname{Tor}^R_i(M, N)$$.

It is called the derived tensor product of M and N. In particular, $\pi_0 (M \otimes_R^L N)$ is the usual tensor product of modules M and N over R.

Geometrically, the derived tensor product corresponds to the intersection product (of derived schemes).

Example: Let R be a simplicial commutative ring, Q(R) → R be a cofibrant replacement, and $\Omega_{Q(R)}^1$ be the module of Kähler differentials. Then

$$\mathbb{L}_R = \Omega_{Q(R)}^1 \otimes^L_{Q(R)} R$$

is an R-module called the cotangent complex of R. It is functorial in R: each R → S gives rise to $\mathbb{L}_R \to \mathbb{L}_S$. Then, for each R → S, there is the cofiber sequence of S-modules

$$\mathbb{L}_{S/R} \to \mathbb{L}_R \otimes_R^L S \to \mathbb{L}_S.$$

The cofiber $\mathbb{L}_{S/R}$ is called the relative cotangent complex.

== See also ==
- derived scheme (derived tensor product gives a derived version of a scheme-theoretic intersection.)
