= Derived stack =

In algebraic geometry, a derived stack is, roughly, a stack together with a sheaf of commutative ring spectra. It generalizes a derived scheme. Derived stacks are the "spaces" studied in derived algebraic geometry.
