= Commutative ring spectrum =

In algebraic topology, a commutative ring spectrum, roughly equivalent to a $E_\infty$-ring spectrum, is a commutative monoid in a good category of spectra.

The category of commutative ring spectra over the field $\mathbb{Q}$ of rational numbers is Quillen equivalent to the category of differential graded algebras over $\mathbb{Q}$.

Example: The Witten genus may be realized as a morphism of commutative ring spectra MString →tmf.

See also: simplicial commutative ring, highly structured ring spectrum and derived scheme.

== Terminology ==
Almost all reasonable categories of commutative ring spectra can be shown to be Quillen equivalent to each other. Thus, from the point view of the stable homotopy theory, the term "commutative ring spectrum" may be used as a synonymous to an $E_\infty$-ring spectrum.
