= Weibel's conjecture =

In mathematics, Weibel's conjecture gives a criterion for vanishing of negative algebraic K-theory groups. The conjecture was proposed by Weibel (1980) and proven in full generality by Kerz, Strunk & Tamme (2018) using methods from derived algebraic geometry. Previously partial cases had been proven by Haesemeyer (2004), Cortiñas et al. (2008), Geisser & Hesselholt (2010), Cisinski (2013), Kelly (2014), and Morrow (2016).

== Statement of the conjecture ==
Weibel's conjecture asserts that for a Noetherian scheme X of finite Krull dimension d, the K-groups vanish in degrees < −d:

$$K_i(X) = 0 \text{ for } i<-d$$

and asserts moreover a homotopy invariance property for negative K-groups

$$K_i(X) = K_i(X\times \mathbb A^r) \text{ for } i\le -d \text{ and arbitrary } r.$$

== Generalization ==
Recently, Kelly, Saito & Tamme (2024) have generalized Weibel's conjecture to arbitrary quasi-compact quasi-separated derived schemes. In this formulation the Krull dimension is replaced by the valuative dimension (that is, maximum of the Krull dimension of all blow-ups). In the case of Noetherian schemes, the Krull dimension is equal to the valuative dimension.
