= Sheaf of spectra =

In algebraic topology, a presheaf of spectra on a topological space X is a contravariant functor from the category of open subsets of X, where morphisms are inclusions, to the good category of commutative ring spectra. A theorem of Jardine says that such presheaves form a simplicial model category, where F →G is a weak equivalence if the induced map of homotopy sheaves $\pi_* F \to \pi_* G$ is an isomorphism. A sheaf of spectra is then a fibrant/cofibrant object in that category.

The notion is used to define, for example, a derived scheme in algebraic geometry.
