= Étale spectrum =

In mathematics, specifically algebraic geometry, the étale spectrum of a commutative ring or of an E_{∞}-ring, denoted by Spec^{ét} or Spét, is an analog of the prime spectrum Spec of a commutative ring that is obtained by replacing the Zariski topology with the étale topology.

The usual prime spectrum Spec enjoys the following relation: for a scheme (S, O_{S}) and a commutative ring A,

$$\operatorname{Hom}(S, \operatorname{Spec}(A)) \simeq \operatorname{Hom}(A, \Gamma(S, \mathcal{O}_S))$$,

where Hom on the left is for morphisms of schemes and Hom on the right ring homomorphisms. That is, Spec is the right adjoint to the global section functor $(S, \mathcal{O}_S) \mapsto \Gamma(S, \mathcal{O}_S)$. So, roughly, one can (and typically does) simply define the étale spectrum Spét to be the right adjoint to the global section functor on the category of "spaces" with étale topology.

Over a field of characteristic zero, Behrend constructs the étale spectrum of a graded algebra called a perfect resolving algebra. He then defines a differential graded scheme (a type of a derived scheme) as one that is étale-locally such an étale spectrum.

The notion makes sense in the usual algebraic geometry but appears more frequently in the context of derived algebraic geometry.
