= Dold–Kan correspondence =

Equivalence between the categories of chain complexes and simplicial abelian groups

In mathematics, more precisely, in the theory of simplicial sets, the Dold–Kan correspondence (named after Albrecht Dold and Daniel Kan) states that there is an equivalence between the category of (nonnegatively graded) chain complexes and the category of simplicial abelian groups. Moreover, under the equivalence, the $n$th homology group of a chain complex is the $n$th homotopy group of the corresponding simplicial abelian group, and a chain homotopy corresponds to a simplicial homotopy. (In fact, the correspondence preserves the respective standard model structures.) The correspondence is an example of the nerve and realization paradigm.

There is also an ∞-category-version of the Dold–Kan correspondence. The book "Nonabelian Algebraic Topology" has a Section 14.8 on cubical versions of the Dold–Kan theorem, and relates them to a previous equivalence of categories between cubical omega-groupoids and crossed complexes, which is fundamental to the work of that book.

== Examples ==
For a chain complex C that has an abelian group A in degree n and zero in all other degrees, the corresponding simplicial group is the Eilenberg–MacLane space $K(A, n)$.

== Detailed construction ==
The Dold–Kan correspondence between the category sAb of simplicial abelian groups and the category $\text{Ch}_{\geq 0}(\textbf{Ab})$ of nonnegatively graded chain complexes can be constructed explicitly through a pair of functors^{pg 149} so that these functors form an equivalence of categories. The first functor is the normalized chain complex functor

$N\colon s\textbf{Ab} \to \text{Ch}_{\geq 0}(\textbf{Ab})$

and the second functor is the "simplicialization" functor

$\Gamma\colon \text{Ch}_{\geq 0}(\textbf{Ab}) \to s\textbf{Ab}$

constructing a simplicial abelian group from a chain complex. The formed equivalence is an instance of a special type of adjunction, called the nerve-realization paradigm (also called a nerve-realization context) where the data of this adjunction is determined by what's called a cosimplicial object $dk\colon \Delta \to \text{Ch}_{\geq 0}(\textbf{Ab})$, and the adjunction then takes the form

$\Gamma = \mathrm{Lan}_y dk : \text{Ch}_{\geq 0}(\textbf{Ab}) \dashv s\textbf{Ab} : \mathrm{Lan}_{dk} y = N$

where we take the left Kan extension and $y$ is the Yoneda embedding.

=== Normalized chain complex ===
Given a simplicial abelian group $A_\bullet \in \text{Ob}(\text{s}\textbf{Ab})$ there is a chain complex $NA_\bullet$ called the normalized chain complex (also called the Moore complex) with terms

$NA_n = \bigcap^{n-1}_{i=0}\ker(d_i) \subset A_n$

and differentials given by

$NA_n \xrightarrow{(-1)^nd_n} NA_{n-1}$

These differentials are well defined because of the simplicial identity

$d_i \circ d_n = d_{n-1}\circ d_i : A_n \to A_{n-2}$

showing the image of $d_n \colon NA_n \to A_{n-1}$ is in the kernel of each $d_i\colon NA_{n-1} \to NA_{n-2}$. This is because the definition of $NA_n$ gives $d_i(NA_n) = 0$.

Now, composing these differentials gives a commutative diagram

$NA_n \xrightarrow{(-1)^nd_n} NA_{n-1} \xrightarrow{(-1)^{n-1}d_{n-1}} NA_{n-2}$

and the composition map $(-1)^n(-1)^{n-1}d_{n-1}\circ d_n$. This composition is the zero map because of the simplicial identity

$d_{n-1}\circ d_n = d_{n-1}\circ d_{n-1}$

and the inclusion $\text{Im}(d_n) \subset NA_{n-1}$, hence the normalized chain complex is a chain complex in $\text{Ch}_{\geq 0 }(\textbf{Ab})$. Because a simplicial abelian group is a functor

$A_\bullet \colon \text{Ord} \to \textbf{Ab}$

and morphisms $A_\bullet \to B_\bullet$ are given by natural transformations, meaning the maps of the simplicial identities still hold, the normalized chain complex construction is functorial.
