= Simplicial group =

Mathematical concept in topology

In mathematics, more precisely, in the theory of simplicial sets, a simplicial group is a simplicial object in the category of groups. Similarly, a simplicial abelian group is a simplicial object in the category of abelian groups. A simplicial group is a Kan complex (in particular, its homotopy groups make sense). The Dold–Kan correspondence says that a simplicial abelian group may be identified with a chain complex. In fact it can be shown that any simplicial abelian group $A$ is non-canonically homotopy equivalent to a product of Eilenberg–MacLane spaces, $\prod_{i\geq 0} K(\pi_iA,i).$

A commutative monoid in the category of simplicial abelian groups is a simplicial commutative ring.

Eckmann (1945) discusses a simplicial analogue of the fact that a cohomology class on a Kähler manifold has a unique harmonic representative and deduces Kirchhoff's circuit laws from these observations.

== See also ==
- Simplicial commutative ring
