= Étale topology =

Type of Grothendieck topology on the category of schemes

In algebraic geometry, the étale topology is a Grothendieck topology on the category of schemes which has properties similar to the Euclidean topology, but unlike the Euclidean topology, it is also defined in positive characteristic. The étale topology was originally introduced by Alexander Grothendieck to define étale cohomology, and this is still the étale topology's most well-known use.

== Definitions ==
For any scheme X, let Ét(X) be the category of all étale morphisms from a scheme to X. This is the analog of the category of open subsets of X (that is, the category whose objects are varieties and whose morphisms are open immersions). Its objects can be informally thought of as étale open subsets of X. The intersection of two objects corresponds to their fiber product over X. Ét(X) is a large category, meaning that its objects do not form a set.

An étale presheaf on X is a contravariant functor from Ét(X) to the category of sets. A presheaf F is called an étale sheaf if it satisfies the analog of the usual gluing condition for sheaves on topological spaces. That is, F is an étale sheaf if and only if the following condition is true. Suppose that U → X is an object of Ét(X) and that U_{i} → U is a jointly surjective family of étale morphisms over X. For each i, choose a section x_{i} of F over U_{i}. The projection map U_{i} × U_{j} → U_{i}, which is loosely speaking the inclusion of the intersection of U_{i} and U_{j} in U_{i}, induces a restriction map F(U_{i}) → F(U_{i} × U_{j}). If for all i and j the restrictions of x_{i} and x_{j} to U_{i} × U_{j} are equal, then there must exist a unique section x of F over U which restricts to x_{i} for all i.

Suppose that X is a Noetherian scheme. An abelian étale sheaf F on X is called finite locally constant if it is a representable functor which can be represented by an étale cover of X. It is called constructible if X can be covered by a finite family of subschemes on each of which the restriction of F is finite locally constant. It is called torsion if F(U) is a torsion group for all étale covers U of X. Finite locally constant sheaves are constructible, and constructible sheaves are torsion. Every torsion sheaf is a filtered inductive limit of constructible sheaves.

Grothendieck originally introduced the machinery of Grothendieck topologies and topoi to define the étale topology. In this language, the definition of the étale topology is succinct but abstract: It is the topology generated by the pretopology whose covering families are jointly surjective families of étale morphisms. The small étale site of X is the category O(X_{ét}) whose objects are schemes U with a fixed étale morphism U → X. The morphisms are morphisms of schemes compatible with the fixed maps to X. The big étale site of X is the category Ét/X, that is, the category of schemes with a fixed map to X, considered with the étale topology.

The étale topology can be defined using slightly less data. First, notice that the étale topology is finer than the Zariski topology. Consequently, to define an étale cover of a scheme X, it suffices to first cover X by open affine subschemes, that is, to take a Zariski cover, and then to define an étale cover of an affine scheme. An étale cover of an affine scheme X can be defined as a jointly surjective family {u_{α} : X_{α} → X} such that the set of all α is finite, each X_{α} is affine, and each u_{α} is étale. Then an étale cover of X is a family {u_{α} : X_{α} → X} which becomes an étale cover after base changing to any open affine subscheme of X.

== Local rings ==
Let X be a scheme with its étale topology, and fix a point x of X. In the Zariski topology, the stalk of X at x is computed by taking a direct limit of the sections of the structure sheaf over all the Zariski open neighborhoods of x. In the étale topology, there are strictly more open neighborhoods of x, so the correct analog of the local ring at x is formed by taking the limit over a strictly larger family. The correct analog of the local ring at x for the étale topology turns out to be the strict henselization of the local ring $\mathcal{O}_{X, x}$. It is usually denoted $\mathcal{O}_{X, x}^\text{sh}$.

== Examples ==
- For each étale morphism $U \to X$, let $\mathbb{G}_m(U) = \mathcal{O}_U(U)^{\times}$. Then $U \mapsto \mathbb{G}_m(U)$ is a presheaf on X; it is a sheaf since it can be represented by the scheme $\operatorname{Spec}_X (\mathcal{O}_X[t, t^{-1}])$.

== Étale topos ==
Let X be a scheme. An étale covering of X is a family $\{ \varphi_i: U_i \to X \}_{i\in I}$, where each $\varphi_i$ is an étale morphism of schemes, such that the family is jointly surjective, that is $X = \bigcup_{i \in I} \varphi_i(U_i)$.

The category Ét(X) is the category of all étale schemes over X. The collection of all étale coverings of a étale scheme U over X i.e. an object in Ét(X) defines a Grothendieck pretopology on Ét(X) which in turn induces a Grothendieck topology, the étale topology on X. The category together with the étale topology on it is called the étale site on X.

The étale topos $X^\text{ét}$ of a scheme X is then the category of all sheaves of sets on the site Ét(X). Such sheaves are called étale sheaves on X. In other words, an étale sheaf $\mathcal F$ is a (contravariant) functor from the category Ét(X) to the category of sets satisfying the following sheaf axiom:

For each étale U over X and each étale covering $\{ \varphi_i: U_i \to U \}$ of U the sequence

$$0 \to \mathcal F(U) \to \prod_{i \in I} \mathcal F(U_i) {{{} \atop \longrightarrow}\atop{\longrightarrow \atop {}}}  \prod_{i,j \in I} \mathcal F(U_{ij})$$

is exact, where $U_{ij} = U_i \times_U U_j$.

== See also ==
- Nisnevich topology
- Smooth topology
- ℓ-adic sheaf
- Étale spectrum
