= Differential graded algebra =

Algebraic structure in homological algebra

In mathematics – particularly in homological algebra, algebraic topology, and algebraic geometry – a differential graded algebra (or DGA, or DG algebra) is an algebraic structure often used to capture information about a topological or geometric space. Explicitly, a differential graded algebra is a graded associative algebra with a chain complex structure that is compatible with the algebra structure.

In geometry, the de Rham algebra of differential forms on a manifold has the structure of a differential graded algebra, and it encodes the de Rham cohomology of the manifold. In algebraic topology, the singular cochains of a topological space form a DGA encoding the singular cohomology. Moreover, American mathematician Dennis Sullivan developed a DGA to encode the rational homotopy type of topological spaces.

== Definitions ==
Let $A_\bullet = \bigoplus\nolimits_{i \in \mathbb{Z}} A_i$ be a $\mathbb{Z}$-graded algebra, with product $\cdot$, equipped with a map $d\colon A_\bullet \to A_\bullet$ of degree $-1$ (homologically graded) or degree $+1$ (cohomologically graded). We say that $(A_\bullet,d,\cdot)$ is a differential graded algebra if $d$ is a differential, giving $A_\bullet$ the structure of a chain complex or cochain complex (depending on the degree), and satisfies a graded Leibniz rule. In what follows, we will denote the "degree" of a homogeneous element $a\in A_i$ by $|a| = i$. Explicitly, the map $d$ satisfies the conditions

1. $d \circ d = 0$, often written $d^2=0$.
2. $d(a \cdot b) = (da) \cdot b + (-1)^{|a|}a \cdot (db)$.

Often one omits the differential and multiplication and simply writes $A_\bullet$ or $A$ to refer to the DGA $(A_\bullet,d,\cdot)$.

A linear map $f: A_\bullet \to B_\bullet$ between graded vector spaces is said to be of degree n if $f(A_i) \subseteq B_{i+n}$ for all $i$. When considering (co)chain complexes, we restrict our attention to chain maps, that is, maps of degree 0 that commute with the differentials $f \circ d_A = d_B \circ f$. The morphisms in the category of DGAs are chain maps that are also algebra homomorphisms.

=== Categorical definition ===
One can also define DGAs more abstractly using category theory. There is a category of chain complexes over a ring $R$, often denoted $\operatorname{Ch}_R$, whose objects are chain complexes and whose morphisms are chain maps. We define the tensor product of chain complexes $(V,d_V)$ and $(W,d_W)$ by

$$(V \otimes W)_n = \bigoplus_{i+j=n} V_i \otimes_R W_j$$

with differential

$$d (v \otimes w) = (d_V v) \otimes w + (-1)^{|v|} v \otimes (d_W w)$$

This operation makes $\operatorname{Ch}_R$ into a symmetric monoidal category. Then, we can equivalently define a differential graded algebra as a monoid object in $\operatorname{Ch}_R$. Heuristically, it is an object in $\operatorname{Ch}_R$ with an associative and unital multiplication.

=== Homology and cohomology ===
Associated to any chain complex $(A_\bullet,d)$ is its homology. Since $d \circ d = 0$, it follows that $\operatorname{im}(d:A_{i+1} \to A_i)$ is a subobject of $\operatorname{ker}(d:A_i \to A_{i-1})$. Thus, we can form the quotient

$$H_i(A_\bullet) = \operatorname{ker}(d:A_i \to A_{i-1}) / \operatorname{im}(d:A_{i+1} \to A_i)$$

This is called the $i$th homology group, and all together they form a graded vector space $H_\bullet(A)$. In fact, the homology groups form a DGA with zero differential. Analogously, one can define the cohomology groups of a cochain complex, which also form a graded algebra with zero differential.

Every chain map $f: (A_\bullet,d_A) \to (B_\bullet,d_B)$ of complexes induces a map on (co)homology, often denoted $f_*: H_\bullet(A) \to H_\bullet(B)$ (respectively $f^*: H^\bullet(B) \to H^\bullet(A)$). If this induced map is an isomorphism on all (co)homology groups, the map $f$ is called a quasi-isomorphism. In many contexts, this is the natural notion of equivalence one uses for (co)chain complexes. We say a morphism of DGAs is a quasi-isomorphism if the chain map on the underlying (co)chain complexes is.

== Properties of DGAs ==
=== Commutative differential graded algebras ===
A commutative differential graded algebra (or CDGA) is a differential graded algebra, $(A_\bullet, d, \cdot)$, which satisfies a graded version of commutativity. Namely,

$$a \cdot b = (-1)^{|a| |b|} b \cdot a$$

for homogeneous elements $a \in A_i, b \in A_j$. Many of the DGAs commonly encountered in math happen to be CDGAs, like the de Rham algebra of differential forms.

=== Differential graded Lie algebras ===
A differential graded Lie algebra (or DGLA) is a differential graded analogue of a Lie algebra. That is, it is a differential graded vector space, $(L_\bullet, d)$, together with an operation $[,]: L_i \otimes L_j \to L_{i+j}$, satisfying the following graded analogues of the Lie algebra axioms.

1. Graded skew-symmetry: $[x,y] = -(-1)^{|x| |y|} [y,x]$ for homogeneous elements $x\in L_i, y \in L_j$.
2. Graded Jacobi identity: $(-1)^{|x||z|}[x,[y,z]] +(-1)^{|y||x|}[y,[z,x]] +(-1)^{|z||y|}[z,[x,y]] = 0$.
3. Graded Leibniz rule: $d [x,y] = [d x,y] + (-1)^{|x|}[x, d y]$.

An example of a DGLA is the de Rham algebra $\Omega^\bullet(M)$ tensored with a Lie algebra $\mathfrak{g}$, with the bracket given by the exterior product of the differential forms and Lie bracket; elements of this DGLA are known as Lie algebra–valued differential forms. DGLAs also arise frequently in the study of deformations of algebraic structures where, over a field of characteristic 0, "nice" deformation problems are described by the space of Maurer-Cartan elements of some suitable DGLA.

=== Formal DGAs ===
A (co)chain complex $C_\bullet$ is called formal if there is a chain map to its (co)homology $H_\bullet(C_\bullet)$ (respectively $H^\bullet(C_\bullet)$), thought of as a complex with 0 differential, that is a quasi-isomorphism. We say that a DGA $A$ is formal if there exists a morphism of DGAs $A \to H_\bullet(A)$ (respectively $A \to H^\bullet(A)$) that is a quasi-isomorphism. This notion is important, for instance, when one wants to consider quasi-isomorphic chain complexes or DGAs as being equivalent, as in the derived category.

== Examples ==
=== Trivial DGAs ===
Notice that any graded algebra $A=\bigoplus\nolimits_i A_i$ has the structure of a DGA with trivial differential, i.e., $d=0$. In particular, as noted above, the (co)homology of any DGA forms a trivial DGA, since it is a graded algebra.

=== The de-Rham algebra ===
Let $M$ be a manifold. Then, the differential forms on $M$, denoted by $\Omega^\bullet(M)$, naturally have the structure of a (cohomologically graded) DGA. The graded vector space is $\Omega^\bullet(M)$, where the grading is given by form degree. This vector space has a product, given by the exterior product, which makes it into a graded algebra. Finally, the exterior derivative $d: \Omega^i(M) \to \Omega^{i+1}(M)$ satisfies $d^2=0$ and the graded Leibniz rule. In fact, the exterior product is graded-commutative, which makes the de Rham algebra an example of a CDGA.

=== Singular cochains ===
Let $X$ be a topological space. Recall that we can associate to $X$ its complex of singular cochains with coefficients in a ring $R$, denoted $(C^\bullet(X;R),d)$, whose cohomology is the singular cohomology of $X$. On $C^\bullet(X;R)$, one can define the cup product of cochains, which gives this cochain complex the structure of a DGA. In the case where $X$ is a smooth manifold and $R=\mathbb{R}$, the de Rham theorem states that the singular cohomology is isomorphic to the de Rham cohomology and, moreover, the cup product and exterior product of differential forms induce the same operation on cohomology.

Note, however, that while the cup product induces a graded-commutative operation on cohomology, it is not graded commutative directly on cochains. This is an important distinction, and the failure of a DGA to be commutative is referred to as the "commutative cochain problem". This problem is important because if, for any topological space $X$, one can associate a commutative DGA whose cohomology is the singular cohomology of $X$ over $R$, then this CDGA determines the $R$-homotopy type of $X$.

=== The free DGA ===
Let $V$ be a (non-graded) vector space over a field $k$. The tensor algebra $T(V)$ is defined to be the graded algebra

$$T(V) = \bigoplus_{i\geq 0} T^i(V) = \bigoplus_{i \geq 0} V^{\otimes i}$$

where, by convention, we take $T^0(V) = k$. This vector space can be made into a graded algebra with the multiplication $T^i(V) \otimes T^j(V) \to T^{i+j}(V)$ given by the tensor product $\otimes$. This is the free algebra on $V$, and can be thought of as the algebra of all non-commuting polynomials in the elements of $V$.

One can give the tensor algebra the structure of a DGA as follows. Let $f: V \to k$ be any linear map. Then, this extends uniquely to a derivation of $T(V)$ of degree $-1$ (homologically graded) by the formula

$$d_f(v_1 \otimes \cdots \otimes v_n) = \sum_{i=1}^n (-1)^{i-1} v_1 \otimes \cdots \otimes f(v_i) \otimes \cdots \otimes v_n$$

One can think of the minus signs on the right-hand side as coming from "jumping" the map $f$ over the elements $v_1, \ldots, v_{i-1}$, which are all of degree 1 in $T(V)$. This is commonly referred to as the Koszul sign rule.

One can extend this construction to differential graded vector spaces. Let $(V_\bullet,d_V)$ be a differential graded vector space, i.e., $d_V: V_i \to V_{i-1}$ and $d^2=0$. Here we work with a homologically graded DG vector space, but this construction works equally well for a cohomologically graded one. Then, we can endow the tensor algebra $T(V)$ with a DGA structure which extends the DG structure on $V$. The differential is given by

$$d(v_1 \otimes \cdots \otimes v_n) = \sum_{i=1}^n (-1)^{|v_1|+\ldots+|v_{i-1}|} v_1 \otimes \cdots \otimes d_V(v_i) \otimes \cdots \otimes v_n$$

This is similar to the previous case, except that now the elements of $V$ can have different degrees, and $T(V)$ is no longer graded by the number of tensor products but instead by the sum of the degrees of the elements of $V$, i.e., $|v_1 \otimes \cdots \otimes v_n| = |v_1| + \ldots + |v_n|$.

=== The free CDGA ===
Similar to the previous case, one can also construct the free CDGA. Given a graded vector space $V_\bullet$, we define the free graded commutative algebra on it by

$$S(V) = \operatorname{Sym}\left( \bigoplus_{i=2k} V_i \right) \otimes \bigwedge \left( \bigoplus_{i=2k+1} V_i \right)$$

where $\operatorname{Sym}$ denotes the symmetric algebra and $\bigwedge$ denotes the exterior algebra. If we begin with a DG vector space $(V_\bullet, d)$ (either homologically or cohomologically graded), then we can extend $d$ to $S(V)$ such that $(S(V),d)$ is a CDGA in a unique way.

== Models for DGAs ==
As mentioned previously, oftentimes one is most interested in the (co)homology of a DGA. As such, the specific (co)chain complex we use is less important, as long as it has the right (co)homology. Given a DGA $A$, we say that another DGA $M$ is a model for $A$ if it comes with a surjective DGA morphism $p : M \to A$ that is a quasi-isomorphism.

=== Minimal models ===
Since one could form arbitrarily large (co)chain complexes with the same cohomology, it is useful to consider the "smallest" possible model of a DGA. We say that a DGA $(A,d,\cdot)$ is minimal if it satisfies the following conditions.

1. It is free as a graded algebra, i.e., $A \cong T(V)$ for some graded vector space $V$.
2. The differential satisfies $d(A) \subseteq A^+ \cdot A^+$, where $A^+ = \bigoplus\nolimits_{i>0} A_i$ consists of the positive degree parts of $A$.

Note that some conventions, often used in algebraic topology, additionally require that $A$ be simply connected, which means that $A^0=k$ and $A^1=0$. This condition on the 0th and 1st degree components of $A$ mirror the (co)homology groups of a simply connected space.

Finally, we say that $M$ is a minimal model for $A$ if it is both minimal and a model for $A$. The fundamental theorem of minimal models states that if $A$ is simply connected then it admits a minimal model, and that if a minimal model exists it is unique up to (non-unique) isomorphism.

=== The Sullivan minimal model ===
Minimal models were used with great success by Dennis Sullivan in his work on rational homotopy theory. Given a simplicial complex $X$, one can define a rational analogue of the (real) de Rham algebra: the DGA $A_{PL}(X)$ of "piecewise polynomial" differential forms with $\mathbb{Q}$-coefficients. Then, $A_{PL}(X)$ has the structure of a CDGA over the field $\mathbb{Q}$, and in fact the cohomology is isomorphic to the singular cohomology of $X$. In particular, if $X$ is a simply connected topological space then $A_{PL}(X)$ is simply connected as a DGA, thus there exists a minimal model.

Moreover, since $A_{PL}(X)$ is a CDGA whose cohomology is the singular cohomology of $X$ with $\mathbb{Q}$-coefficients, it is a solution to the commutative cochain problem. Thus, if $X$ is a simply connected CW complex with finite dimensional rational homology groups, the minimal model of the CDGA $A_{PL}(X)$ captures entirely the rational homotopy type of $X$.

== See also ==
- Differential graded scheme
- Rational homotopy theory
- Homotopy associative algebra
