= Locally constant function =

Type of mathematical function

The signum function restricted to the domain $\R\setminus\{0\}$ is locally constant.

In mathematics, a locally constant function is a function from a topological space into a set with the property that around every point of its domain, there exists some neighborhood of that point on which it restricts to a constant function.

== Definition ==
Let $f : X \to S$ be a function from a topological space $X$ into a set $S.$ If $x \in X$ then $f$ is said to be locally constant at $x$ if there exists a neighborhood $U \subseteq X$ of $x$ such that $f$ is constant on $U,$ which by definition means that $f(u) = f(v)$ for all $u, v \in U.$ The function $f : X \to S$ is called locally constant if it is locally constant at every point $x \in X$ in its domain.

== Examples ==
Every constant function is locally constant. The converse will hold if its domain is a connected space.

Every locally constant function from the real numbers $\R$ to $\R$ is constant, by the connectedness of $\R.$ But the function $f : \Q \to \R$ from the rationals $\Q$ to $\R,$ defined by $f(x) = 0 \text{ for } x < \pi,$ and $f(x) = 1 \text{ for } x > \pi,$ is locally constant (this uses the fact that $\pi$ is irrational and that therefore the two sets $\{ x \in \Q : x < \pi \}$ and $\{ x \in \Q : x > \pi \}$ are both open in $\Q$).

If $f : A \to B$ is locally constant, then it is constant on any connected component of $A.$ The converse is true for locally connected spaces, which are spaces whose connected components are open subsets.

Further examples include the following:

- Given a covering map $p : C \to X,$ then to each point $x \in X$ we can assign the cardinality of the fiber $p^{-1}(x)$ over $x$; this assignment is locally constant.
- A map from a topological space $A$ to a discrete space $B$ is continuous if and only if it is locally constant.

== Connection with sheaf theory ==
There are sheaves of locally constant functions on $X.$ To be more definite, the locally constant integer-valued functions on $X$ form a sheaf in the sense that for each open set $U$ of $X$ we can form the functions of this kind; and then verify that the sheaf axioms hold for this construction, giving us a sheaf of abelian groups (even commutative rings). This sheaf could be written $Z_X$; described by means of stalks we have stalk $Z_x,$ a copy of $Z$ at $x,$ for each $x \in X.$ This can be referred to a constant sheaf, meaning exactly sheaf of locally constant functions taking their values in the (same) group. The typical sheaf of course is not constant in this way; but the construction is useful in linking up sheaf cohomology with homology theory, and in logical applications of sheaves. The idea of local coefficient system is that we can have a theory of sheaves that locally look like such 'harmless' sheaves (near any $x$), but from a global point of view exhibit some 'twisting'.

== See also ==
- Liouville's theorem (complex analysis) – Theorem in complex analysis
- Locally constant sheaf
