= Topological category =

In mathematics, topological category may refer to:

- A concept in categorical topology; see topological functor
- A category enriched over the category of topological spaces; see Topological category (enriched category theory)
