= Limit and colimit of presheaves =

In category theory, a branch of mathematics, a limit or a colimit of presheaves on a category C is a limit or colimit in the functor category $\widehat{C} = \mathbf{Fct}(C^{\text{op}}, \mathbf{Set})$.

The category $\widehat{C}$ admits small limits and small colimits. Explicitly, if $f: I \to \widehat{C}$ is a functor from a small category I and U is an object in C, then $\varinjlim_{i \in I} f(i)$ is computed pointwise:

$$(\varinjlim f(i))(U) = \varinjlim f(i)(U).$$

The same is true for small limits. Concretely this means that, for example, a fiber product exists and is computed pointwise.

When C is small, by the Yoneda lemma, one can view C as a full subcategory of $\widehat{C}$. If $\eta: C \to D$ is a functor, if $f: I \to C$ is a functor from a small category I and if the colimit $\varinjlim f$ in $\widehat{C}$ is representable; i.e., isomorphic to an object in C, then, in D,

$$\eta(\varinjlim f) \simeq \varinjlim \eta \circ f$$

(in particular the colimit on the right exists in D). In other words, if the Yoneda embedding of C preserves the colimit of a functor into C, then every functor out of C preserves that colimit.

The density theorem states that every presheaf is a colimit of representable presheaves.
