= ∞-topos =

Higher categorical generalization of a topos

In mathematics, an ∞-topos (infinity-topos) is, roughly, an ∞-category such that its objects behave like sheaves of spaces with some choice of Grothendieck topology; in other words, it gives an intrinsic notion of sheaves without reference to an external space. The prototypical example of an ∞-topos is the ∞-category of sheaves of spaces on some topological space. But the notion is more flexible; for example, the ∞-category of étale sheaves on some scheme is not the ∞-category of sheaves on any topological space but it is still an ∞-topos.

Precisely, in Lurie's Higher Topos Theory, an ∞-topos is defined as an ∞-category X such that there is a small ∞-category C and an (accessible) left exact localization functor from the ∞-category of presheaves of spaces on C to X. A theorem of Lurie states that an ∞-category is an ∞-topos if and only if it satisfies an ∞-categorical version of Giraud's axioms in ordinary topos theory. A "topos" is a category behaving like the category of sheaves of sets on a topological space. In analogy, Lurie's definition and characterization theorem of an ∞-topos says that an ∞-topos is an ∞-category behaving like the category of sheaves of spaces.

== Lurie characterization theorem ==
It says:

Theorem—Let $X$ be an ∞-category. Then the following are equivalent.

(a) $X$ is an ∞-topos.
(b) $X$ satisfies Giraud's axioms in the ∞-category setting: (1) it is a presentable ∞-category, (2) colimits in X are universal, (3) coproducts in X are disjoint and (4) every groupoid object in X is effective.

== See also ==
- Bousfield localization
- Homotopy hypothesis – Hypothesis in mathematical category theory
- ∞-groupoid – Abstract homotopical model for topological spaces
- Simplicial set
- Kan complex – Concept in the theory of simplicial sets.
