= Weak equivalence between simplicial sets =

Concept in algebraic topology

In mathematics, especially algebraic topology, a weak equivalence between simplicial sets is a map between simplicial sets that is invertible in some weak sense. Formally, it is a weak equivalence in some model structure on the category of simplicial sets (so the meaning depends on a choice of a model structure.)

An ∞-category can be (and is usually today) defined as a simplicial set satisfying the weak Kan condition. Thus, the notion is especially relevant to higher category theory.

== Equivalent conditions ==
Theorem— Let $f : X \to Y$ be a map between simplicial sets. Then the following are equivalent:

- $f$ is a weak equivalence in the sense of Joyal (Joyal model category structure).
- $f^* : \operatorname{ho} \underline{\operatorname{Hom}}(Y, V) \to \operatorname{ho}\underline{\operatorname{Hom}}(X, V)$ is an equivalence of categories for each ∞-category V, where ho means the homotopy category of an ∞-category,
- $f^* : \underline{\operatorname{Hom}}(Y, V)^{\simeq} \to \underline{\operatorname{Hom}}(X, V)^{\simeq}$ is a weak homotopy equivalence for each ∞-category V, where the superscript $\simeq$ means the core.

If $X, Y$ are ∞-categories, then a weak equivalence between them in the sense of Joyal is exactly an equivalence of ∞-categories (a map that is invertible in the homotopy category).

Let $f : X \to Y$ be a functor between ∞-categories. Then we say

- $f$ is fully faithful if $f : \operatorname{Map}(a, b) \to \operatorname{Map}(f(a), f(b))$ is an equivalence of ∞-groupoids for each pair of objects $a, b$.
- $f$ is essentially surjective if for each object $y$ in $Y$, there exists some object $a$ such that $y \simeq f(a)$.

Then $f$ is an equivalence if and only if it is fully faithful and essentially surjective.
