= Homotopy category of an ∞-category =

In mathematics, especially category theory, the homotopy category of an ∞-category C is the category where the objects are those in C but the hom-set from x to y is the quotient of the set of morphisms from x to y in C by an appropriate equivalence relation.

If an ∞-category is defined as a weak Kan complex (usual definition), then the construction is due to Boardman and Vogt, who also gave the definition of an ∞-category as a weak Kan complex. In this case, the homotopy category of an ∞-category C is equivalent to $\tau(C)$, where $\tau$ is a left adjoint of the nerve functor.

For example, the singular complex of a (reasonable) topological space X is a Kan complex and the homotopy category of it is the fundamental groupoid of X.

== Boardman–Vogt construction ==
Let C be an ∞-category. If $f, g : x \to y$ are morphisms (1-simplexes) in C, then we write $f \sim g$ if there is a 2-simplex $\sigma : \Delta^2 \to C$ such that $\sigma(0 \to 1) = f, \, \sigma(0 \to 2) = g, \, \sigma(1 \to 2) = \operatorname{id}_y.$ Then by Joyal's work, the relation $\sim$ turns out to be an equivalence relation. Hence, we can take the quotient

$$[x, y] = \operatorname{Hom}_C(x, y)/\sim.$$

Then the homotopy category $\tau(C)$ in the sense of Boardman–Vogt is the category where $\operatorname{obj}(\tau(C)) = \operatorname{obj}(C)$, $\operatorname{Hom}_{\tau(C)}(x, y) = [x, y]$ and the composition is given by $[f] \circ [g] = [h]$ when $h$ exhibits some composition of $f, g$.

Let $\pi_0$ be a left adjoint to the inclusion of the category of sets into the category of simplicial sets. If $K$ is a Kan complex, then $\pi_0 K$ coincides with the set of simplicial homotopy classes of maps $\Delta^0 \to K$. Then

$$\operatorname{Hom}_{\tau(C)}(x, y) \simeq \pi_0 \operatorname{Map}(x, y)$$

for each objects $x, y$ in $C$.

== See also ==
- Weak equivalence between simplicial sets
