= Weak equivalence =

In mathematics, weak equivalence may refer to:

- Weak equivalence of categories
- Weak equivalence (homotopy theory)
- Weak equivalence between simplicial sets
- Weak equivalence (formal languages)

== See also ==
- Weak equivalence principle
