= Simplicial category =

In mathematics, simplicial category may refer to:

- Simplex category, the category of finite ordinals and order-preserving functions
- Simplicially enriched category, a category enriched over the category of simplicial sets
- Simplicial object in the category of categories
