= Simplicial space =

Simplicial object in the category of topological spaces

In mathematics, a simplicial space is a simplicial object in the category of topological spaces. In other words, it is a contravariant functor from the simplex category Δ to the category of topological spaces.

A Segal category is a kind of simplicial space, this is a model of an infinity category introduced by Hirschowitz & Simpson (1998), based on work of Graeme Segal in 1974.

A Segal space is a simplicial space satisfying some pullback conditions, making it look like a homotopical version of a category. More precisely, a simplicial set, considered as a simplicial discrete space, satisfies the Segal conditions if and only if it is the nerve of a category. The condition for Segal spaces is a homotopical version of this. Complete Segal spaces were introduced by Rezk (2001) as models for (∞, 1)-categories.
