= Density theorem =

In mathematics, density theorem may refer to

- Density conjecture for Kleinian groups
- Chebotarev's density theorem in algebraic number theory
- Jacobson density theorem in algebra
- Kaplansky density theorem in algebra
- Lebesgue's density theorem in measure theory
- Density theorem (category theory) in category theory
