= Density theorem (category theory) =

In category theory, a branch of mathematics, the density theorem states that every presheaf of sets is a colimit of representable presheaves in a canonical way.

For example, by definition, a simplicial set is a presheaf on the simplex category Δ and a representable simplicial set is exactly of the form $\Delta^n = \operatorname{Hom}(-, [n])$ (called the standard n-simplex) so the theorem says: for each simplicial set X,

$$X \simeq \varinjlim \Delta^n$$

where the colim runs over an index category determined by X.

== Statement ==
Let F be a presheaf on a category C; i.e., an object of the functor category $\widehat{C} = \mathbf{Fct}(C^\text{op}, \mathbf{Set})$. For an index category over which a colimit will run, let I be the category of elements of F: it is the category where

1. an object is a pair $(U, x)$ consisting of an object U in C and an element $x \in F(U)$,
2. a morphism $(U, x) \to (V, y)$ consists of a morphism $u: U \to V$ in C such that $(Fu)(y) = x.$

It comes with the forgetful functor $p: I \to C$.

Then F is the colimit of the diagram (i.e., a functor)

$$I \overset{p}\to C \to \widehat{C}$$

where the second arrow is the Yoneda embedding: $U \mapsto h_U = \operatorname{Hom}(-, U)$.

== Proof ==
Let f denote the above diagram. To show the colimit of f is F, we need to show: for every presheaf G on C, there is a natural bijection:

$$\operatorname{Hom}_{\widehat{C}} (F, G) \simeq \operatorname{Hom} (f, \Delta_G)$$

where $\Delta_G$ is the constant functor with value G and Hom on the right means the set of natural transformations. This is because the universal property of a colimit amounts to saying $\varinjlim -$ is the left adjoint to the diagonal functor $\Delta_{-}.$

For this end, let $\alpha: f \to \Delta_G$ be a natural transformation. It is a family of morphisms indexed by the objects in I:

$$\alpha_{U, x}: f(U, x) = h_U \to \Delta_G(U, x) = G$$

that satisfies the property: for each morphism $(U, x) \to (V, y), u: U \to V$ in I, $\alpha_{V, y} \circ h_u = \alpha_{U, x}$ (since $f((U, x) \to (V, y)) = h_u.$)

The Yoneda lemma says there is a natural bijection $G(U) \simeq \operatorname{Hom}(h_U, G)$. Under this bijection, $\alpha_{U, x}$ corresponds to a unique element $g_{U, x} \in G(U)$. We have:

$$(Gu)(g_{V, y}) = g_{U, x}$$

because, according to the Yoneda lemma, $Gu: G(V) \to G(U)$ corresponds to $- \circ h_u: \operatorname{Hom}(h_V, G) \to \operatorname{Hom}(h_U, G).$

Now, for each object U in C, let $\theta_U: F(U) \to G(U)$ be the function given by $\theta_U(x) = g_{U, x}$. This determines the natural transformation $\theta: F \to G$; indeed, for each morphism $(U, x) \to (V, y), u: U \to V$ in I, we have:

$$(G u \circ \theta_V)(y) = (Gu)(g_{V, y}) = g_{U, x} = (\theta_U \circ Fu)(y),$$

since $(Fu)(y) = x$. Clearly, the construction $\alpha \mapsto \theta$ is reversible. Hence, $\alpha \mapsto \theta$ is the requisite natural bijection.
