= Homotopy dimension =

In mathematics, especially algebraic topology, the homotopy dimension of a topological space does not have a fixed meaning. However, it can refer to

- the minimum dimension of a CW complex that is homotopy equivalent to the space.
- the Lebesgue covering dimension of the space
- homotopy dimension introduced by Lurie in his Higher Topos Theory for an ∞-topos.
