= Localization of an ∞-category =

In mathematics, specifically in higher category theory, a localization of an ∞-category is an ∞-category obtained by inverting some maps.

An ∞-category is a presentable ∞-category if it is a localization of an ∞-presheaf category in the sense of Bousfield, by definition or as a result of Simpson.

== Definition ==
Let S be a simplicial set and W a simplicial subset of it. Then the localization in the sense of Dwyer–Kan is a map

$$u: S \to W^{-1}S$$

such that

- $W^{-1}S$ is an ∞-category,
- the image $u(W_1)$ consists of invertible maps,
- the induced map on ∞-categories
  $$u^* : \operatorname{Hom}(W^{-1}S, -) \overset{\sim}\to \operatorname{Hom}_W(S, -)$$

is invertible.

When W is clear form the context, the localized category $S^{-1} W$ is often also denoted as $L(S)$.

A Dwyer–Kan localization that admits a right adjoint is called a localization in the sense of Bousfield. For example, the inclusion ∞-Grpd $\hookrightarrow$ ∞-Cat has a left adjoint given by the localization that inverts all maps (functors). The right adjoint to it, on the other hand, is the core functor (thus the localization is Bousfield).

== Properties ==
Let C be an ∞-category with small colimits and $W \subset C$ a subcategory of weak equivalences so that C is a category of cofibrant objects. Then the localization $C \to L(C)$ induces an equivalence

$$L(\underline{\operatorname{Hom}}(X, C)) \overset{\sim}\to \underline{\operatorname{Hom}}(X, L(C))$$

for each simplicial set X.

Similarly, if C is a hereditary ∞-category with weak fibrations and cofibrations, then

$$L(\underline{\operatorname{Hom}}(I, C)) \overset{\sim}\to \underline{\operatorname{Hom}}(I, L(C))$$

for each small category I.

== See also ==
- ∞-topos
