= Topological functor =

In category theory and general topology, a topological functor is one which has similar properties to the forgetful functor from the category of topological spaces. The domain of a topological functor admits construction similar to initial topology (and equivalently the final topology) of a family of functions. The notion of topological functors generalizes (and strengthens) that of fibered categories, for which one considers a single morphism instead of a family.

A topological functor is considered in the field of categorical topology.

== Definition ==
=== Source and sink ===
A source $(X,(Y_i)_{i\in I},(f_i\colon X\to Y_i)_{i\in I})$ in a category $\mathcal E$ consists of the following data:

- an object $X\in\mathcal E$,
- a (possibly proper) class of objects $(Y_i)_{i\in I}\subseteq\mathcal E$
- and a class of morphisms $(f_i\colon X\to Y_i)_{i\in I}$.

Dually, a sink $(X,(Y_i)_{i\in I},(f_i\colon Y_i\to X)_{i\in I})$ in $\mathcal E$ consists of

- an object $X\in\mathcal E$,
- a class of objects $(Y_i)_{i\in I}\subseteq\mathcal E$
- and a class of morphisms $(f_i\colon Y_i\to X)_{i\in I}$.

In particular, a source $(f_i\colon X\to Y_i)_{i\in I}$ is an object $X$ if $I$ is empty, a morphism $X\to Y$ if $I$ is a set of a single element. Similarly for a sink.

=== Initial source and final sink ===
Let $(f_i\colon X\to Y_i)_{i\in I}$ be a source in a category $\mathcal E$ and let $\Pi\colon\mathcal E\to\mathcal B$ be a functor. The source $(f_i)_{i\in I}$ is said to be a $\Pi$-initial source if it satisfies the following universal property.

- For every object $X'\in\mathcal E$, a morphism $\hat g\colon \Pi(X')\to\Pi(X)$ and a family of morphisms $(f'_i\colon X'\to Y_i)_{i\in I}$ such that $\Pi(f_i)\circ\hat g=\Pi(f'_i)$ for each $i\in I$, there exists a unique $\mathcal E$-morphism $g\colon X'\to X$ such that $\hat g=\Pi(g)$ and $\forall i\in I\colon f_i\circ g=f'_i$.
  $$\begin{matrix}
\mathcal E&\qquad\overset\Pi\to\qquad&\mathcal B\\
\hline
\begin{matrix}
X'\\
{\scriptstyle\exists!g}\downarrow{\color{White}\scriptstyle\exists!g}&\searrow\!\!^{f'_i}\!\!\!\!\!\!\\
X&\underset{f_i}\to&Y_i
\end{matrix}&\qquad\overset\Pi\mapsto\qquad&\begin{matrix}
\Pi X'\\
{\scriptstyle\hat g}\downarrow{\color{White}\scriptstyle\hat g}&\searrow\!\!^{\Pi f'_i}\!\!\!\!\!\!\\
\Pi X&\underset{\Pi f_i}\to&\Pi Y_i
\end{matrix}
\end{matrix}$$

Similarly one defines the dual notion of $\Pi$-final sink.

When $I$ is a set of a single element, the initial source is called a Cartesian morphism.

=== Lift ===
Let $\mathcal E$, $\mathcal B$ be two categories. Let $\Pi\colon\mathcal E\to\mathcal B$ be a functor. A source $(\hat f_i\colon\hat X\to\hat Y_i)_{i\in I}$ in $\mathcal B$ is a $\Pi$-structured source if for each $i$ we have $\hat Y_i=\Pi(Y_i)$ for some $Y_i\in\mathcal E$. One similarly defines a $\Pi$-structured sink.

A lift of a $\Pi$-structured source $(\hat f_i\colon\hat X\to \Pi(Y_i))_{i\in I}$ is a source $(f_i\colon X\to Y_i)_{i\in I}$ in $\mathcal E$ such that $\Pi(X)=\hat X$ and $\Pi(f_i)=\hat f_i$ for each $i\in I$
$$\begin{matrix}
\mathcal E&\qquad\overset\Pi\to\qquad&\mathcal B\\
\hline
\begin{matrix}
\exists X\\
{\scriptstyle\exists f_i}\downarrow{\color{White}\scriptstyle\exists f_i}\\
Y_i
\end{matrix}&\qquad\overset\Pi\mapsto\qquad&\begin{matrix}
\hat X\\
{\scriptstyle\hat f_i}\downarrow{\color{White}\scriptstyle\hat f_i}\\
\Pi Y_i
\end{matrix}
\end{matrix}$$
A lift of a $\Pi$-structured sink is similarly defined. Since initial and final lifts are defined via universal properties, they are unique up to a unique isomorphism, if they exist.

If a $\Pi$-structured source $(\hat X\to\Pi(Y_i))_{i\in I}$ has an initial lift $(X\to Y_i)_{i\in I}$, we say that $X$ is an initial $\mathcal E$-structure on $\hat X$ with respect to $(\hat X\to\Pi(Y_i))_{i\in I}$. Similarly for a final $\mathcal E$-structure with respect to a $\Pi$-structured sink.

=== Topological functor ===
Let $\Pi\colon\mathcal E\to\mathcal B$ be a functor. Then the following two conditions are equivalent.

- Every $\Pi$-structured source has an initial lift. That is, an initial structure always exists.
- Every $\Pi$-structured sink has a final lift. That is, a final structure always exists.

A functor satisfying this condition is called a topological functor.

One can define topological functors in a different way, using the theory of enriched categories.

A concrete category $(\mathcal E,F)$ is called a topological (concrete) category if the forgetful functor $F\colon\mathcal E\to\operatorname{Set}$ is topological. (A topological category can also mean an enriched category enriced over the category $\operatorname{Top}$ of topological spaces.) Some require a topological category to satisfy two additional conditions.

- Constant functions in $\mathbf{Set}$ lift to $\mathcal E$-morphisms.
- Fibers $\Pi^{-1}(\hat X)$ ($\hat X\in \mathbf{Set}$) are small (they are sets and not proper classes).

== Properties ==
Every topological functor is faithful.

Let $\mathsf P$ be one of the following four properties of categories:

- complete category
- cocomplete category
- well-powered category
- co-well-powered category

If $\Pi\colon\mathcal E\to\mathcal B$ is topological and $\mathcal B$ has property $\mathsf P$, then $\mathcal E$ also has property $\mathsf P$.

Let $\mathcal E$ be a category. Then the topological functors $\mathcal E\to\operatorname{Set}$ are unique up to natural isomorphism.

== Examples ==
An example of a topological category is the category of all topological spaces with continuous maps, where one uses the standard forgetful functor.
