= Mackey functor =

Mathematical functor in representation theory and algebraic topology

In mathematics, particularly in representation theory and algebraic topology, a Mackey functor is a type of functor that generalizes various constructions in group theory and equivariant homotopy theory. Named after American mathematician George Mackey, these functors were first introduced by German mathematician Andreas Dress in 1971.

== Definition ==
=== Classical definition ===
Let $G$ be a finite group. A Mackey functor $M$ for $G$ consists of:

- For each subgroup $H \leq G$, an abelian group $M(H)$,
- For each pair of subgroups $H, K \leq G$ with $H \subseteq K$:
  - A restriction homomorphism $R^K_H: M(K) \to M(H)$,
  - A transfer homomorphism $I^K_H: M(H) \to M(K)$.

These maps must satisfy the following axioms:

Functoriality: For nested subgroups $H \subseteq K \subseteq L$, $R^L_H = R^K_H \circ R^L_K$ and $I^L_H = I^L_K \circ I^K_H$.
Conjugation: For any $g \in G$ and $H \leq G$, there are isomorphisms $c_g: M(H) \to M(gHg^{-1})$ compatible with restriction and transfer.
Double coset formula: For subgroups $H, K \leq G$, the following identity holds:

$R^G_H I^G_K = \sum_{x \in [H\backslash G/K]} I^H_{H \cap xKx^{-1}} \circ c_x \circ R^K_{x^{-1}Hx \cap K}$.

=== Modern definition ===
In modern category theory, a Mackey functor can be defined more elegantly using the language of spans. Let $\mathcal{C}$ be a disjunctive quasi-category and $\mathcal{A}$ be an additive quasi-category. A Mackey functor is a product-preserving functor $M: \text{Span}(\mathcal{C}) \to \mathcal{A}$ where $\text{Span}(\mathcal{C})$ is the quasi-category of correspondences in $\mathcal{C}$.

== Applications ==
=== In equivariant homotopy theory ===
Mackey functors play an important role in equivariant stable homotopy theory. For a genuine $G$-spectrum $E$, its equivariant homotopy groups form a Mackey functor given by:

$$\pi_n(E): G/H \mapsto [G/H_+ \wedge S^n, X]^G$$

where $[-,-]^G$ denotes morphisms in the equivariant stable homotopy category.

=== Cohomology with Mackey functor coefficients ===
For a pointed G-CW complex $X$ and a Mackey functor $A$, one can define equivariant cohomology with coefficients in $A$ as:

$$H^n_G(X,A) := H^n(\text{Hom}(C_\bullet(X), A))$$

where $C_\bullet(X)$ is the chain complex of Mackey functors given by stable equivariant homotopy groups of quotient spaces.
