= Edward George Effros =

American mathematician (1935–2019)

- Born: December 10, 1935; Queens, New York City
- Died: December 21, 2019 (aged 84); Portland, Oregon
- Occupation: Mathematician
- Spouse: Rita Brickman (m. 1967)
- Children: 2

Academic background
- Education: Massachusetts Institute of Technology, Harvard University
- Doctoral advisor: George Mackey

Edward George Effros (December 10, 1935, Queens, New York City – December 21, 2019, Portland, Oregon) was an American mathematician, specializing in operator algebras and representation theory. His research included "C*-algebras theory and operator algebras, descriptive set theory, Banach space theory, and quantum information."

== Biography ==
Edward Effros grew up in Great Neck, New York. He finished his undergraduate study in three years at Massachusetts Institute of Technology and received his Ph.D. from Harvard University in 1962. His thesis On Representations of $C^*$-algebras was supervised by George Mackey. Effros was a postdoc at Columbia University and then became a faculty member at the University of Pennsylvania. Effros married Rita Brickman in 1967. Their two children, Rachel and Stephen, were born in Philadelphia. In 1980 Edward Effros became a full professor at the University of California at Los Angeles (UCLA), and in 1979 the family relocated to Los Angeles. Rita Brickman Effros received her Ph.D. in immunology from the University of Pennsylvania. Eventually, she became a professor of pathology and laboratory medicine at the David Geffen School of Medicine at UCLA. In 2013 Edward Effros retired from UCLA as professor emeritus.

He was a Guggenheim Fellow for the academic year 1982–1983. In 1986 he was an invited speaker at the International Congress of Mathematicians in Berkeley, California. He was the author or coauthor of over 80 publications and supervised the doctoral dissertations of 16 students, including Patricia Clark Kenschaft. He was elected to the 2014 Class of Fellows of the American Mathematical Society.

According to Masamichi Takesaki,

Probably one can divide his mathematical achievements into the following areas:

1. His contribution, from the mid-1960s to the mid-1970s, to consolidating and expanding the “Mackey philosophy” through his work on (for example) the Effros Borel Space of von Neumann algebras on a separable Hilbert space, the Direct Disintegration of von Neumann algebras and/or representations of $C^*$-algebras, and the Operator Algebraic Structure Analysis of Compact Convex Sets (a significant contribution to the Choquet School) [Eff65, Eff08].
2. Nuclear C*-algebras and related topics in the mid-1970s. Among many important contributions by Ed in this area, he and his collaborator, Man-Duen Choi, proved the equivalence of the nuclearity and the approximation of the identity map by completely positive finite rank maps for a $C^*$-algebra [CE76a,Eff81].
3. Dimension Groups in the early 1980s, where Ed and his coauthors David E. Handelman and Chao Liang Shen gave a beautiful characterization of the dimension groups of AF $C^*$algebras as Riesz groups [EHS80].
4. Operator spaces and quantized functional analysis, from the mid-1980s onwards. It is my impression that Ed viewed this work as his most important contribution to mathematics, regarding it as the quantization of analysis [Eff89, Eff09, ER94].

Edward's older brother, Robert Carlton Effros (born 1933), became a lawyer and member of the legal department of the International Monetary Fund. Edward's identical twin, Richard M. Effros, graduated from NYU School of Medicine and became a pulmonologist. Edward was married to Rita née Brinkman for 52 years. Their daughter Rachel Marian Effros (born 1969) became a pediatrician. Their son Stephen David Effros (born 1972) became a senior project manager for Portland Public Schools in Portland, Oregon. In June 2019 Edward and Rita relocated to Portland, but Edward died 6 months later. Upon his death he was survived by his wife, daughter, son, and two granddaughters.

== Selected publications ==
=== Articles ===
- Effros, Edward G. (1965). "Transformation Groups and $C^*$-algebras". Annals of Mathematics. 81 (1): 38–55. doi:10.2307/1970381. JSTOR 1970381.
- Effros, Edward G.; Gleit, Alan (1969). "Structure in simplexes. III. Composition series". Transactions of the American Mathematical Society. 142: 355–379. doi:10.1090/S0002-9947-1969-0247421-5. ISSN 0002-9947.
- Alfsen, Erik M.; Effros, Edward G. (1972). "Structure in Real Banach Spaces. Part II". Annals of Mathematics. 96 (1): 129–173. doi:10.2307/1970896. JSTOR 1970896.
- Effros, Edward G. (1975). "Property $\Gamma$ and inner amenability". Proceedings of the American Mathematical Society. 47 (2): 483. doi:10.1090/S0002-9939-1975-0355626-6.
- Choi, Man-Duen; Effros, Edward G. (1976). "The Completely Positive Lifting Problem for $C^*$-algebras". Annals of Mathematics. 104 (3): 585–609. doi:10.2307/1970968. JSTOR 1970968.
- Choi, Man-Duen; Effros, Edward G. (1977). "Injectivity and operator spaces". Journal of Functional Analysis. 24 (2): 156–209. doi:10.1016/0022-1236(77)90052-0.
- Effros, Edward G.; Lance, E. Christopher (1977). "Tensor products of operator algebras" (PDF). Advances in Mathematics. 25 (1): 1–34. doi:10.1016/0001-8708(77)90085-8.
- Choi, Man-Duen; Effros, Edward G. (1978). "Nuclear $C^*$-Algebras and the Approximation Property". American Journal of Mathematics. 100 (1): 61–79. doi:10.2307/2373876. JSTOR 2373876.
- Effros, Edward G.; Haagerup, Uffe (1985). "Lifting problems and local reflexivity for $C^*$-algebras". Duke Mathematical Journal. 52 (1): 103–128. doi:10.1215/S0012-7094-85-05207-X. ISSN 0012-7094.
- Effros, Edward G.; Ruan, Zhong-Jin (1991). "A New Approach to Operator Spaces". Canadian Mathematical Bulletin. 34 (3): 329–337. doi:10.4153/CMB-1991-053-x.
- Effros, Edward G.; Ruan, Zhong-Jin (1997). "On the Analogues of Integral Mappings and Local Reflexivity for Operator Spaces". Indiana University Mathematics Journal. 46 (4): 1289–1310. doi:10.1512/iumj.1997.46.1429. JSTOR 24899664.
- Effros, Edward G.; Winkler, Soren (1997). "Matrix Convexity: Operator Analogues of the Bipolar and Hahn–Banach Theorems". Journal of Functional Analysis. 144: 117–152. doi:10.1006/jfan.1996.2958.
- Effros, E. G.; Popa, M. (2003). "Feynman diagrams and Wick products associated with q-Fock space". Proceedings of the National Academy of Sciences. 100 (15): 8629–8633. arXiv:math/0303045. Bibcode:2003PNAS..100.8629E. doi:10.1073/pnas.1531460100. PMC 166362. PMID 12857947.
- Effros, E. G. (2009). "A matrix convexity approach to some celebrated quantum inequalities". Proceedings of the National Academy of Sciences. 106 (4): 1006–1008. arXiv:0802.1234. Bibcode:2009PNAS..106.1006E. doi:10.1073/pnas.0807965106. PMC 2633548. PMID 19164582.

=== Books ===
- Effros, Edward G. (1965). Structure in simplexes. Aarhus: Aarhus Universitet, Matematisk Institut.
- Effros, Edward G.; Hahn, Frank (1967). Locally Compact Transformation Groups and $C^*$-Algebras. ISBN 9780821812754.
- Effros, Edward G. (1981). Dimensions and $C^*$-Algebras. ISBN 9780821816974.
- Operator Spaces. Clarendon Press. 2000. ISBN 978-0-19-853482-2.
