= Paul Chernoff =

American mathematician (1942–2017)

Paul Robert Chernoff
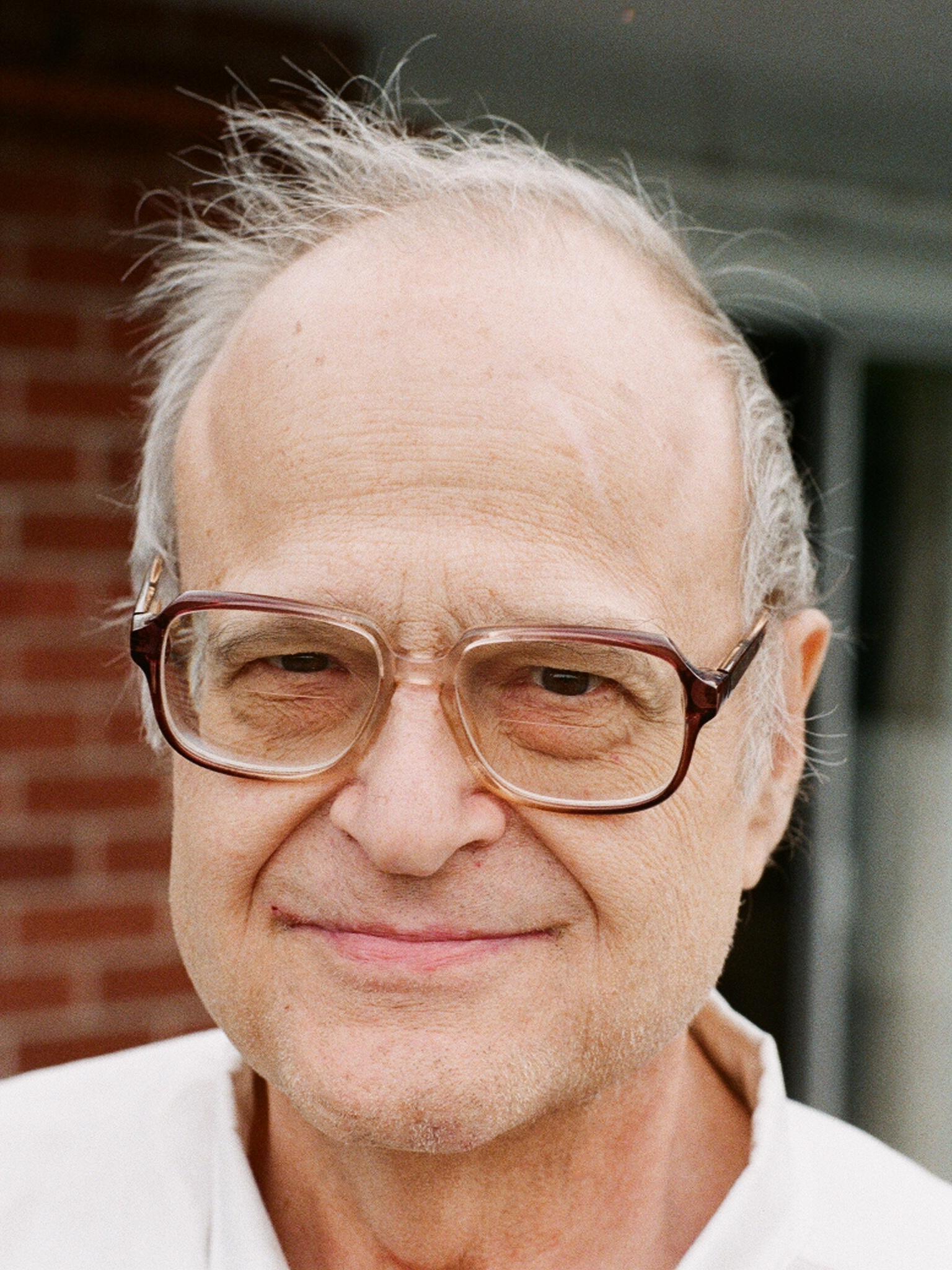
- Chernoff in Berkeley, 2014
- Born: 21 June 1942; Philadelphia, Pennsylvania
- Died: 17 January 2017 (aged 74)
- Education: Harvard University
- Awards: Fellow of the American Association for the Advancement of Science (1984); AMS Fellow (2012)
- Scientific career
- Fields: Mathematics
- Workplaces: University of California, Berkeley; University of California at Los Angeles; Institute for Advanced Study
- Thesis: Semigroup Product Formulas and Addition of Unbounded Operators (1968)
- Doctoral advisor: George Mackey

Paul Robert Chernoff (21 June 1942, Philadelphia – 17 January 2017) was an American mathematician, specializing in functional analysis and the mathematical foundations of quantum mechanics. He is known for Chernoff's Theorem, a mathematical result in the Feynman path integral formulation of quantum mechanics. He was also the author of limericks.

== Education and career ==
Chernoff graduated from Central High School in Philadelphia. He matriculated at Harvard University, where he received bachelor's degree, summa cum laude, in 1963, master's degree in 1965, and Ph.D. in 1968 under George Mackey with thesis Semigroup Product Formulas and Addition of Unbounded Operators.

At the University of California, Berkeley, he became in 1969 a lecturer, in 1971 an assistant professor, and in 1980 a full professor. U. C. Berkeley awarded him multiple Distinguished Teaching Awards and the Lili Fabilli and Eric Hoffer Essay Prize. In 1986 he was a visiting professor at the University of Pennsylvania.

Chernoff was elected in 1984 a Fellow of the American Association for the Advancement of Science and in 2012 a Fellow of the American Mathematical Society.

He gave in 1981 a simplified proof of the Groenewold-Van Hove theorem, which is a no-go theorem that relates classical mechanics to quantum mechanics.

== Selected publications ==
- Chernoff Paul (1968). "Note on product formulas for operator semigroups". J. Funct. Analysis. 2 (2): 238–242. doi:10.1016/0022-1236(68)90020-7.
- Chernoff, Paul; Rasala, Richard; Waterhouse, William (1968). "The Stone-Weierstrass theorem for valuable fields" (PDF). Pacific Journal of Mathematics. 27 (2): 233–240. doi:10.2140/pjm.1968.27.233.
- Chernoff Paul (1972). "Some remarks on quasi-analytic vectors". Trans. Amer. Math. Soc. 167: 105–113. doi:10.1090/S0002-9947-1972-0295125-5.
- Chernoff Paul (1973). "Representations, automorphisms, and derivations of some operator algebras". J. Funct. Analysis. 12 (3): 275–289. doi:10.1016/0022-1236(73)90080-3.
- Chernoff Paul (1973). "Essential self-adjointness of powers of generators of hyperbolic equations". J. Funct. Analysis. 12 (4): 401–414. doi:10.1016/0022-1236(73)90003-7.
- Paul Chernoff Product formulas, nonlinear semigroups, and addition of unbounded operators, American Mathematical Society 1974.
- Paul Chernoff; Jerrold Marsden: Properties of infinite dimensional Hamiltonian systems, Springer 1974
- Chernoff Paul (1976). "Understanding mathematical proofs: Conceptual barriers". Science. 193 (4250): 276. doi:10.1126/science.193.4250.276.a. PMID 17745711.
- Chernoff Paul (1977). "The quantum n-body problem and a theorem of Littlewood" (PDF). Pacific J. Math. 70: 117–123. doi:10.2140/pjm.1977.70.117.
- Chernoff Paul (1995). "Irreducible representations of infinite-dimensional transformation groups and Lie algebras, I.". J. Funct. Anal. 130 (2): 255–282. doi:10.1006/jfan.1995.1069.
- Chernoff Paul, Hughes Rhonda (1993). "A new class of point interactions in one dimension". Journal of Functional Analysis. 111 (1): 97–117. doi:10.1006/jfan.1993.1006.
- Chernoff Paul, Hughes R (1996). "Some examples related to Kato's conjecture". J. Austral. Math. Soc. Ser. A. 60 (2): 274–286. doi:10.1017/S1446788700037666.
- Chernoff Paul (2000). "Quantization and irreducible representations of infinite-dimensional transformation groups and Lie algebras" (PDF). Eletron. J. Differ. Equ. Conf. 4. Proceedings of the Symposium on Mathematical Physics and Quantum Field Theory (Berkeley, CA, 1999): 17–22.
- Chernoff Paul (2000). "A pseudo zeta function and the distribution of primes". Proc. Natl. Acad. Sci. USA. 97 (14): 7697–7699. doi:10.1073/pnas.97.14.7697. PMC 16606. PMID 10884402. (There is a typographical error: "One can show that C(s) may be analytically continued at least into the half-plane Re s > 0 except for an isolated singularity (presumably a simple pole) at s = 0." This should be "at s = 1" according to the mathematical argument given.)
