= Core of a category =

In mathematics, especially category theory, the core of a category C is the category whose objects are the objects of C and whose morphisms are the invertible morphisms in C. In other words, it is the largest groupoid subcategory.

As a functor $C \mapsto \operatorname{core}(C)$, the core is a right adjoint to the inclusion of the category of (small) groupoids into the category of (small) categories. On the other hand, the left adjoint to the above inclusion is the fundamental groupoid functor.

For ∞-categories, $\operatorname{core}$ is defined as a right adjoint to the inclusion ∞-Grpd $\hookrightarrow$ ∞-Cat. The core of an ∞-category $C$ is then the largest ∞-groupoid contained in $C$. The core of C is also often written as $C^{\simeq}$. The left adjoint to the above inclusion is given by a localization of an ∞-category.

In Kerodon, the subcategory of a 2-category C obtained by removing non-invertible morphisms is called the pith of C. It can also be defined for an (∞, 2)-category C; namely, the pith of C is the largest simplicial subset that does not contain non-thin 2-simplexes.
