= (n, m)-category =

Structure in category theory

In mathematics, specifically in category theory, an (n, m)-category is an n-category all of whose j-morphisms for $j > m$ are invertible. This notion has orthographic variation, such as (m, k)-category, (m, r)-category and etc. An (n, m)-category is considered a generalization of n-category and n-groupoid, and further (skeletal in poset case) (0, 1)-category can be defined from the notion of proset and poset.

In an infinity category theory, assume that all j-morphisms of dimension greater than a certain dimension to be invertible, for example, in a quasi-category, all morphisms dimension $\geq 2$ are invertible, and this is called an (∞, 1)-category. We also have other (∞, 1)-category models, such as simplicial category, Segal category, and complete Segal space. More generally, an (∞, n)-category is a generalization of an (∞, 1)-category, where each k-morphism is invertible for $k > n$.

== Definition of (n, m)-category ==
=== Definition of (n, m)-category given by (weak) n-category ===
An (n, m)-category is an (weak) n-category all of whose j-morphisms for $j > m$ are invertible.

=== Definition of (n, m)-category given by ∞-category ===
An (n, m)-category can be defined even if a instead of regarding an n-category as enriched over (n − 1)-categories, one return to regarding it as an ∞-category in which all cells of dimension $> n$ are identities. The following definition give the characterization of (n, m)-categories, which includes the case of prosets.

An (n, m)-category is an ∞-category such that:

- All j-morphisms for $j > n$ exist and are unique wherever possible. In particular, this implies that all parallel (n + 1)-morphisms are equal.
- All j-morphisms for $j > m$ are invertible.

== Example ==
- A (0, 0)-category is up to equivalence the same as a set.
- A (1, 0)-category is a 1-groupoid. A groupoid is an ordinary category in which every morphism is invertible.
- A (2, 0)-category is a 2-groupoid.
- An ∞-groupoid is an (∞, 0)-category.
- An (n, 0)-category is a n-groupoid. An n-groupoid is an n-category where all morphisms are equivalences.
- A (1, 1)-category is an ordinary category.
- A (2, 2)-category is a 2-category.
- A (2, 1)-category is a 2-category in which all 2-morphisms are invertible. For example, Lurie used this for the weakening of a 2-category and called it a bicategory, but in the terminology of standard 2-category theory, the 2-morphisms of a bicategory are not required to be invertible (He called this a strict bicategory).
- An (n, n)-category is an n-category.
- A (0, 1)-category (a.k.a thin category) can be seen as a proset (if it has a skeleton, then up to equivalence it is a poset).
- An (∞, 1)-category is a not-necessarily-quasi-category ∞-category in which all n-morphisms for $n > 1$ are equivalences.
- An (∞, 2)-category has several models. For the equivalence of all models known in 2022 of the (∞, 2)-category, see Figure 1 by Gagna–Harpaz–Lanari.

== See also ==
- Joyal's theta category
