= Simplicially enriched category =

Category enriched over the category of simplicial sets

In mathematics, a simplicially enriched category, is a category enriched over the category of simplicial sets. Simplicially enriched categories are often also called, more ambiguously, simplicial categories; the latter term however also applies to simplicial objects in Cat (the category of small categories). Simplicially enriched categories can, however, be identified with simplicial objects in Cat whose object part is constant, or more precisely, all face and degeneracy maps are bijective on objects. Simplicially enriched categories can model (∞, 1)-categories, but the dictionary has to be carefully built. Namely, many notions (limits, for example) are different from the limits in the sense of enriched category theory.

The homotopy coherent nerve of a simplicially enriched category is a simplicial set that generalizes the nerve of a category.
