= Fundamental groupoid =

In algebraic topology, the fundamental groupoid is a certain topological invariant of a topological space. It can be viewed as an extension of the more widely-known fundamental group; as such, it captures information about the homotopy type of a topological space. In terms of category theory, the fundamental groupoid is a certain functor from the category of topological spaces to the category of groupoids.

[...] people still obstinately persist, when calculating with fundamental groups, in fixing a single base point, instead of cleverly choosing a whole packet of points which is invariant under the symmetries of the situation, which thus get lost on the way. In certain situations (such as descent theorems for fundamental groups à la Van Kampen) it is much more elegant, even indispensable for understanding something, to work with fundamental groupoids with respect to a suitable packet of base points, [,,,]

— Alexander Grothendieck, Esquisse d'un Programme (Section 2, English translation)

== Definition ==
Let X be a topological space. Consider the equivalence relation on continuous paths in X in which two continuous paths are equivalent if they are homotopic with fixed endpoints. The fundamental groupoid Π(X), or Π_{1}(X), assigns to each ordered pair of points (p, q) in X the collection of equivalence classes of continuous paths from p to q. More generally, the fundamental groupoid of X on a set S restricts the fundamental groupoid to the points which lie in both X and S. This allows for a generalisation of the Van Kampen theorem using two base points to compute the fundamental group of the circle.

As suggested by its name, the fundamental groupoid of X naturally has the structure of a groupoid. In particular, it forms a category; the objects are taken to be the points of X and the collection of morphisms from p to q is the collection of equivalence classes given above. The fact that this satisfies the definition of a category amounts to the standard fact that the equivalence class of the concatenation of two paths only depends on the equivalence classes of the individual paths. Likewise, the fact that this category is a groupoid, which asserts that every morphism is invertible, amounts to the standard fact that one can reverse the orientation of a path, and the equivalence class of the resulting concatenation contains the constant path.

Note that the fundamental groupoid assigns, to the ordered pair (p, p), the fundamental group of X based at p.

== Basic properties ==
Given a topological space X, the path-connected components of X are naturally encoded in its fundamental groupoid; the observation is that p and q are in the same path-connected component of X if and only if the collection of equivalence classes of continuous paths from p to q is nonempty. In categorical terms, the assertion is that the objects p and q are in the same groupoid component if and only if the set of morphisms from p to q is nonempty.

Suppose that X is path-connected, and fix an element p of X. One can view the fundamental group π_{1}(X, p) as a category; there is one object and the morphisms from it to itself are the elements of π_{1}(X, p). The selection, for each q in M, of a continuous path from p to q, allows one to use concatenation to view any path in X as a loop based at p. This defines an equivalence of categories between π_{1}(X, p) and the fundamental groupoid of X. More precisely, this exhibits π_{1}(X, p) as a skeleton of the fundamental groupoid of X.

The fundamental groupoid of a (path-connected) differentiable manifold X is actually a Lie groupoid, arising as the gauge groupoid of the universal cover of X.

== Bundles of groups and local systems ==
Given a topological space X, a local system is a functor from the fundamental groupoid of X to a category. As an important special case, a bundle of (abelian) groups on X is a local system valued in the category of (abelian) groups. This is to say that a bundle of groups on X assigns a group G_{p} to each element p of X, and assigns a group homomorphism G_{p} → G_{q} to each continuous path from p to q. In order to be a functor, these group homomorphisms are required to be compatible with the topological structure, so that homotopic paths with fixed endpoints define the same homomorphism; furthermore the group homomorphisms must compose in accordance with the concatenation and inversion of paths. One can define homology with coefficients in a bundle of abelian groups.

When X satisfies certain conditions, a local system can be equivalently described as a locally constant sheaf.

== Examples ==
- The fundamental groupoid of the singleton space is the trivial groupoid (a groupoid with one object * and one morphism Hom(*, *) = { id_{*} : * → * }
- The fundamental groupoid of the circle is connected and all of its vertex groups are isomorphic to $(\mathbb{Z},+)$, the additive group of integers.

== The homotopy hypothesis ==
The homotopy hypothesis, a well-known conjecture in homotopy theory formulated by Alexander Grothendieck, states that a suitable generalization of the fundamental groupoid, known as the fundamental ∞-groupoid, captures all information about a topological space up to weak homotopy equivalence.

== See also ==
- Homotopy category of an ∞-category
- core of a category (while the fundamental groupoid is a left adjoint to the inclusion of Gprd, the core is a right adjoint)
