= George Mackey =

American mathematician

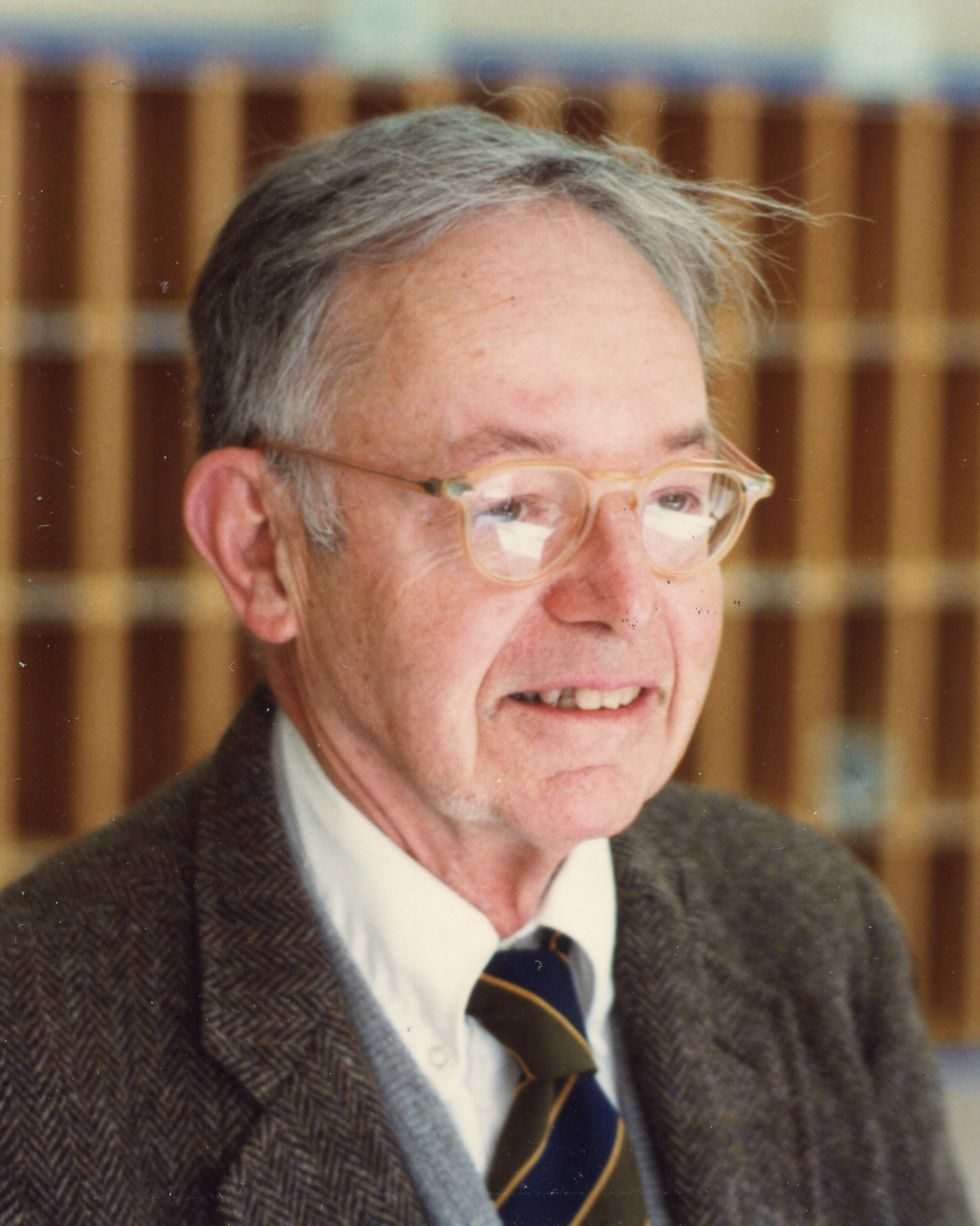
- Mackey in Berkeley, 1984
- Born: February 1, 1916; St. Louis, Missouri, U.S.
- Died: March 15, 2006 (aged 90); Belmont, Massachusetts, U.S.
- Education: Rice University (BA); Harvard University (PhD)
- Known for: Locally convex spaces Mackey theory Quantum logic Mackey topology Mackey space Mackey–Arens theorem Mackey functor Mackey–Borel structure
- Awards: Leroy P. Steele Prize (1975)
- Scientific career
- Fields: Mathematical analysis
- Institutions: Harvard University
- Thesis: The Subspaces of the Conjugate of an Abstract Linear Space (1942)
- Doctoral advisor: Marshall H. Stone
- Doctoral students: John V. Breakwell; Lawrence G. Brown; Paul Chernoff; Edward G. Effros; Calvin C. Moore; Richard Palais; Caroline Series; John Wermer; Robert Zimmer
- Other notable students: Andrew M. Gleason

George Whitelaw Mackey (February 1, 1916 – March 15, 2006) was an American mathematician known for his contributions to quantum logic, representation theory, and noncommutative geometry.

== Career ==
Mackey earned his B.A. at Rice University in 1938 and obtained his Ph.D. at Harvard University in 1942 under the direction of Marshall H. Stone. He joined the Harvard University Mathematics Department in 1943, was appointed Landon T. Clay Professor of Mathematics and Theoretical Science in 1969 and remained there until he retired in 1985.

== Work ==
Earlier in his career Mackey did significant work in the duality theory of locally convex spaces, which provided tools for subsequent work in this area, including Alexander Grothendieck's work on topological tensor products.

Mackey was one of the pioneer workers in the intersection of quantum logic, the theory of infinite-dimensional unitary representations of groups, the theory of operator algebras and noncommutative geometry. A central role in Mackey's work, both in the theory of group representations and in mathematical physics, was played by the concepts of system of imprimitivity and induced representations. This idea led naturally to an analysis of the representation theory of semi-direct products in terms of ergodic actions of groups and in some cases a complete classification of such representations. Mackey's results were essential tools in the study of the representation theory of nilpotent Lie groups using the method of orbits developed by Alexandre Kirillov in the 1960s. His notion of "virtual subgroup", introduced in 1966 using the language of groupoids, had a significant influence in ergodic theory.

Another essential ingredient in Mackey's work was the assignment of a Borel structure to the dual object of a locally compact group (specifically a locally compact separable metric group) G. One of Mackey's important conjectures, which was eventually solved by work of James Glimm on C*-algebras, was that G is type I (meaning that all its factor representations are of type I) if and only if the Borel structure of its dual is a standard Borel space.

He has written numerous survey articles connecting his research interests with a large body of mathematics and physics, particularly quantum mechanics and statistical mechanics.

== Honours and students ==
Mackey was among the first five recipients of William Lowell Putnam fellowships in 1938. He received the Leroy P. Steele Prize in 1975 for his article Ergodic theory and its significance for statistical mechanics and probability theory.

Mackey was an elected member of the American Academy of Arts and Sciences the National Academy of Sciences and the American Philosophical Society.

Lawrence G. Brown, Paul Chernoff, Edward G. Effros, Calvin Moore, Richard Palais, Caroline Series, John Wermer and Robert Zimmer have been doctoral students of Mackey. Andrew Gleason had no PhD, but considered Mackey to be his advisor.

== Books ==
- Mathematical Foundations of Quantum Mechanics (Dover Books on Mathematics, 2004 ISBN 0-486-43517-2 ISBN 978-0-486-43517-6)
- Unitary Group Representations in Physics, Probability, and Number Theory, 402 pages, Benjamin–Cummings Publishing Company (1978), ISBN 0-8053-6703-9
- The Theory of Unitary Group Representations (Chicago Lectures in Mathematics) University Of Chicago Press (August 1, 1976) ISBN 0-226-50051-9
- Induced representations of groups and quantum mechanics, Publisher: W. A. Benjamin (1968)
- Mathematical Problems of Relativistic Physics (Lectures in Applied Mathematics Series, Vol 2) by I. E. Segal, George Whitelaw Mackey, Publisher: Amer Mathematical Society (June 1967) ISBN 0-8218-1102-9
- Lectures on the theory of functions of a complex variable Publisher: R. E. Krieger Pub. Co (1977) ISBN 0-88275-531-5

== See also ==
- Bornological space
