= John Wermer =

- Born: April 4, 1927; Vienna, Austria
- Died: August 29, 2022 (aged 95); Providence, Rhode Island, U.S.
- Education: Harvard University (BA, PhD)
- Scientific career
- Fields: Mathematics
- Workplaces: Yale University; Brown University
- Thesis: On the Harmonic Analysis of Certain Groups and Semi-Groups of Operators (1951)
- Doctoral advisor: George Mackey

John Wermer was a mathematician specializing in complex analysis.

Wermer received his Ph.D. from Harvard University in 1951 under the supervision of George Whitelaw Mackey. He became an instructor at Yale University, after which he was hired as a professor at Brown University in 1954. He retired in 1994.

In 1962 Wermer was an invited speaker at the International Congress of Mathematicians in Stockholm.

In 2012, Wermer became a fellow of the American Mathematical Society.

On August 29, 2022, Wermer died in Providence, Rhode Island at the age of 95.
