= Categorical topology =

Mathematical discipline

In mathematics, categorical topology is an approach to topology (theory of spaces) through the concepts and methods in category theory, a branch of mathematics dealing with abstract concepts. In a more detailed description:

In order to handle problems of a topological nature, various attempts have been made in the past to introduce suitable concepts, e.g. topological spaces, uniform spaces, proximity spaces, limit spaces, uniform convergence spaces etc. Since this situation was unsatisfactory, new methods were needed to unify all these theories. Thus a new discipline - called Categorical Topology - was created (about 1971). It deals with the investigation of topological categories and their relationships to each other.

== See also ==
- Category of topological spaces
- Topological functor
