= Topological category (enriched category theory) =

Categorical treatment of topological spaces

In category theory, a discipline in mathematics, a topological category is a category that is enriched over the category of compactly generated Hausdorff spaces. They can be used as a foundation for higher category theory, where they can play the role of ($\infty$,1)-categories. An important example of a topological category in this sense is given by the category of CW complexes, where each set Hom(X,Y) of continuous maps from X to Y is equipped with the compact-open topology. (Lurie 2009)

== See also ==
- Infinity category
- Simplicial category
