= Simplicial homotopy =

In algebraic topology, a simplicial homotopy is an analog of a homotopy between topological spaces for simplicial sets. Precisely,^{pg 23} if

$$f, g: X \to Y$$

are maps between simplicial sets, a simplicial homotopy from f to g is a map

$$h: X \times \Delta^{1} \to Y$$

such that the restriction of $h$ along $X \simeq X \times \Delta^{0} \overset{0}\hookrightarrow X \times \Delta^{1}$ is $f$ and the restriction along $1$ is $g$; see . In particular, $f(x) = h(x, 0)$ and $g(x) = h(x, 1)$ for all x in X.

Using the adjunction

$$\operatorname{Hom}(X \times \Delta^1, Y) = \operatorname{Hom}(\Delta^1 \times X, Y) = \operatorname{Hom}(\Delta^1, \underline{\operatorname{Hom}}(X, Y))$$,

the simplicial homotopy $h$ can also be thought of as a path in the simplicial set $\underline{\operatorname{Hom}}(X, Y).$

A simplicial homotopy is in general not an equivalence relation. However, if $\underline{\operatorname{Hom}}(X, Y)$ is a Kan complex (e.g., if $Y$ is a Kan complex), then a homotopy from $f : X \to Y$ to $g : X \to Y$ is an equivalence relation. Indeed, a Kan complex is an ∞-groupoid; i.e., every morphism (path) is invertible. Thus, if h is a homotopy from f to g, then the inverse of h is a homotopy from g to f, establishing that the relation is symmetric. The transitivity holds since a composition is possible.

== Simplicial homotopy equivalence ==
If $X$ is a simplicial set and $K$ a Kan complex, then we form the quotient

$$[X, K] = \operatorname{Hom}(X, K)/\sim$$

where $f \sim g$ means $f, g$ are homotopic to each other. It is the set of the simplicial homotopy classes of maps from $X$ to $K$. More generally, Quillen defines homotopy classes using the equivalence relation generated by the homotopy relation.

A map $K \to L$ between Kan complexes is then called a simplicial homotopy equivalence if the homotopy class $[f]$ of it is bijective; i.e., there is some $g$ such that $fg \sim \operatorname{id}_L$ and $gf \sim \operatorname{id}_K$.

An obvious pointed version of the above consideration also holds.

== Simplicial homotopy group ==
Let $S^1$ be the pushout $\Delta^1 \sqcup_{\partial \Delta^1} 1$ along the boundary $S^0 = \partial \Delta^1$ and $S^n = S^1 \wedge \cdots \wedge S^1$ n-times. Then, as in usual algebraic topology, we define

$$\pi_n X = [S^n, X]$$

for each pointed Kan complex X and an integer $n \ge 0$. It is the n-th simplicial homotopy group of X (or the set for $n = 0$). For example, each class in $\pi_0 X$ amounts to a path-connected component of $X$.

If $X$ is a pointed Kan complex, then the mapping space

$$\Omega X = \operatorname{Map}_X(x_0, x_0)$$

from the base point to itself is also a Kan complex called the loop space of $X$. It is also pointed with the base point the identity and so we can iterate: $\Omega^n X$. It can be shown

$$\Omega^n X = \underline{\operatorname{Hom}}(S^n, X)$$

as pointed Kan complexes. Thus,

$$\pi_n X = \pi_0 \Omega^n X.$$

Now, we have the identification $\pi_0 \operatorname{Map}_C(x, y) = \operatorname{Hom}_{\tau(C)}(x, y)$ for the homotopy category $\tau(C)$ of an ∞-category C and an endomorphism group is a group. So, $\pi_n X$ is a group for $n \ge 1$. By the Eckmann-Hilton argument, $\pi_n X$ is abelian for $n \ge 2$.

An analog of Whitehead's theorem holds: a map $f$ between Kan complexes is a homotopy equivalence if and only if for each choice of base points and each integer $n \ge 0$, $\pi_n(f)$ is bijective.

== See also ==
- Kan complex
- Dold–Kan correspondence (under which a chain homotopy corresponds to a simplicial homotopy)
- Simplicial homology
- Homotopy category of an ∞-category
