= Presheaf (category theory) =

Contravariant functor to Set

In category theory, a branch of mathematics, a presheaf on a category $C$ is a functor $F\colon C^\mathrm{op}\to\mathbf{Set}$. If $C$ is the poset of open sets in a topological space, interpreted as a category, then one recovers the usual notion of presheaf on a topological space.

A morphism of presheaves is defined to be a natural transformation of functors. This makes the collection of all presheaves on $C$ into a category, and is an example of a functor category. It is often written as $\widehat{C} = \mathbf{Set}^{C^\mathrm{op}}$ and it is called the category of presheaves on $C$. A functor into $\widehat{C}$ is sometimes called a profunctor.

A presheaf that is naturally isomorphic to the contravariant hom-functor Hom(–, A) for some object A of C is called a representable presheaf.

Some authors refer to a functor $F\colon C^\mathrm{op}\to\mathbf{V}$ as a $\mathbf{V}$-valued presheaf.

== Examples ==
- A simplicial set is a Set-valued presheaf on the simplex category $C=\Delta$.
- A directed multigraph is a presheaf on the category with two objects and two parallel morphisms between them i.e. $C = (E \overset{s}{\underset{t}{\longrightarrow}} V)$.
- An arrow category is a presheaf on the category with two objects and one morphism between them. i.e. $C = (E \overset{f}{\longrightarrow} V)$.
- A right group action is a presheaf on the category created from a group $G$, i.e. a category with one object and invertible morphisms.

== Properties ==
- When $C$ is a small category, the functor category $\widehat{C}=\mathbf{Set}^{C^\mathrm{op}}$ is cartesian closed.
- The poset of subobjects of $P$ form a Heyting algebra, whenever $P$ is an object of $\widehat{C}=\mathbf{Set}^{C^\mathrm{op}}$ for small $C$.
- For any morphism $f:X\to Y$ of $\widehat{C}$, the pullback functor of subobjects $f^*:\mathrm{Sub}_{\widehat{C}}(Y)\to\mathrm{Sub}_{\widehat{C}}(X)$ has a right adjoint, denoted $\forall_f$, and a left adjoint, $\exists_f$. These are the universal and existential quantifiers.
- A locally small category $C$ embeds fully and faithfully into the category $\widehat{C}$ of set-valued presheaves via the Yoneda embedding which to every object $A$ of $C$ associates the hom functor $C(-,A)$.
- The category $\widehat{C}$ admits small limits and small colimits. See limit and colimit of presheaves for further discussion.
- The density theorem states that every presheaf is a colimit of representable presheaves; in fact, $\widehat{C}$ is the colimit completion of $C$ (see #Universal property below.)

== Universal property ==
The construction $C \mapsto \widehat{C} = \mathbf{Fct}(C^{\text{op}}, \mathbf{Set})$ is called the colimit completion of C because of the following universal property:

Proposition—Let C, D be categories and assume D admits small colimits. Then each functor $\eta: C \to D$ factorizes as

$$C \overset{y}\longrightarrow \widehat{C} \overset{\widetilde{\eta}}\longrightarrow D$$

where y is the Yoneda embedding and $\widetilde{\eta}: \widehat{C} \to D$ is a, unique up to isomorphism, colimit-preserving functor called the Yoneda extension of $\eta$.

Proof: Given a presheaf F, by the density theorem, we can write $F =\varinjlim y U_i$ where $U_i$ are objects in C. Then let $\widetilde{\eta} F = \varinjlim \eta U_i,$ which exists by assumption. Since $\varinjlim -$ is functorial, this determines the functor $\widetilde{\eta}: \widehat{C} \to D$. Succinctly, $\widetilde{\eta}$ is the left Kan extension of $\eta$ along y; hence, the name "Yoneda extension". To see $\widetilde{\eta}$ commutes with small colimits, we show $\widetilde{\eta}$ is a left-adjoint (to some functor). Define $\mathcal{H}om(\eta, -): D \to \widehat{C}$ to be the functor given by: for each object M in D and each object U in C,

$$\mathcal{H}om(\eta, M)(U) = \operatorname{Hom}_D(\eta U, M).$$

Then, for each object M in D, since $\mathcal{H}om(\eta, M)(U_i) = \operatorname{Hom}(y U_i, \mathcal{H}om(\eta, M))$ by the Yoneda lemma, we have:

$$\begin{align}
\operatorname{Hom}_D(\widetilde{\eta} F, M) &= \operatorname{Hom}_D(\varinjlim \eta U_i, M) = \varprojlim \operatorname{Hom}_D(\eta U_i, M) = \varprojlim \mathcal{H}om(\eta, M)(U_i) \\
&= \operatorname{Hom}_{\widehat{C}}(F, \mathcal{H}om(\eta, M)),
\end{align}$$

which is to say $\widetilde{\eta}$ is a left-adjoint to $\mathcal{H}om(\eta, -)$. $\square$

The proposition yields several corollaries. For example, the proposition implies that the construction $C \mapsto \widehat{C}$ is functorial: i.e., each functor $C \to D$ determines the functor $\widehat{C} \to \widehat{D}$.

== Variants ==
A presheaf of spaces on an ∞-category C is a contravariant functor from C to the ∞-category of spaces (for example, the nerve of the category of CW-complexes.) It is an ∞-category version of a presheaf of sets, as a "set" is replaced by a "space". The notion is used, among other things, in the ∞-category formulation of Yoneda's lemma that says: $C \to \widehat{C}$ is fully faithful (here C can be just a simplicial set.)

A copresheaf of a category C is a presheaf of C^{op}. In other words, it is a covariant functor from C to Set.

== See also ==
- Topos
- Category of elements
- Simplicial presheaf (this notion is obtained by replacing "set" with "simplicial set")
- Presheaf with transfers
