= Quasi-category =

Type of simplicial set that is a model of ∞-category

In mathematics, more specifically category theory, a quasi-category (also called quasicategory, weak Kan complex, inner Kan complex, infinity category, ∞-category, Boardman complex, quategory) is a generalization of the notion of a category. (This is a generalization in the sense that we will recharacterize ordinary categories as a particular kind of simplicial set, then after that its characterization is relaxed to get the definition of quasicategories.) The study of such generalizations is known as higher category theory.

== Overview ==
Quasi-categories were introduced by Boardman & Vogt (1973). André Joyal has much advanced the study of quasi-categories showing that most of the usual basic category theory and some of the advanced notions and theorems have their analogues for quasi-categories. An elaborate treatise of the theory of quasi-categories has been expounded by Jacob Lurie (2009).

Quasi-categories are certain simplicial sets. Like ordinary categories, they contain objects (the 0-simplices of the simplicial set) and morphisms between these objects (1-simplices). But unlike categories, the composition of two morphisms need not be uniquely defined. All the morphisms that can serve as composition of two given morphisms are related to each other by higher order invertible morphisms (2-simplices thought of as "homotopies"). These higher order morphisms can also be composed, but again the composition is well-defined only up to still higher order invertible morphisms, etc.

The idea of higher category theory (at least, higher category theory when higher morphisms are invertible) is that, as opposed to the standard notion of a category, there should be a mapping space (rather than a mapping set) between two objects. This suggests that a higher category should simply be a topologically enriched category. The model of quasi-categories is, however, better suited to applications than that of topologically enriched categories, though it has been proved by Lurie that the two have natural model structures that are Quillen equivalent (see § Homotopy coherent nerve).

== Definition ==
By definition, a quasi-category C is a simplicial set satisfying the inner Kan conditions (also called weak Kan condition): every inner horn in C, namely a map of simplicial sets $\Lambda^k[n]\to C$ where $0<k<n$, has a filler, that is, an extension to a map $\Delta[n]\to C$. (See Kan fibration#Definitions for a definition of the simplicial sets $\Delta[n]$ and $\Lambda^k[n]$.)

The idea is that 2-simplices $\Delta[2] \to C$ are supposed to represent commutative triangles (at least up to homotopy). A map $\Lambda^1[2] \to C$ represents a composable pair. Thus, in a quasi-category, one cannot define a composition law on morphisms, since one can choose many ways to compose maps.

According to Joyal, one consequence of the definition is that $C^{\Delta[2]} \to C^{\Lambda^1[2]}$ is a trivial Kan fibration. In other words, while the composition law is not uniquely defined, it is unique up to a contractible choice.

== The homotopy category ==
Given a quasi-category C, one can associate to it an ordinary category hC, called the homotopy category of C. The homotopy category has as objects the vertices of C. The morphisms are given by homotopy classes of edges between vertices. Composition is given using the horn filler condition for n = 2.

For a general simplicial set there is a functor $\tau$ from sSet to Cat, the left-adjoint of the nerve functor, and for a quasi-category C, we have $\tau(C)=hC$.

== Examples ==
- The nerve of a category is a quasi-category with the extra property that the filling of any inner horn is unique. Conversely a quasi-category such that any inner horn has a unique filling is isomorphic to the nerve of some category. The homotopy category of the nerve of C is isomorphic to C.
- Given a topological space X, one can define its singular set S(X), also known as the fundamental ∞-groupoid of X. S(X) is a quasi-category in which every morphism is invertible. The homotopy category of S(X) is the fundamental groupoid of X.
- More general than the previous example, every Kan complex is an example of a quasi-category. In a Kan complex all maps from all horns—not just inner ones—can be filled, which again has the consequence that all morphisms in a Kan complex are invertible. Kan complexes are thus analogues to groupoids - the nerve of a category is a Kan complex iff the category is a groupoid.
- Kan complexes themselves form an ∞-category denoted as Kan or also S. Precisely, it is the homotopy coherent nerve of the category of Kan complexes (see also § Homotopy coherent nerve).
- Similarly, the ∞-category of (small) ∞-categories is defined as the homotopy coherent nerve of the category of ∞-categories. Precisely, let K be the simplicially-enriched category where an object is a small ∞-category and the hom-simplicial-set from C to D is the core of the ∞-category $\underline{\operatorname{Hom}}(C, D)$. Then the homotopy coherent nerve of K is the ∞-category of small ∞-categories.

== Homotopy coherent nerve ==
An ordinary nerve of a category misses higher morphisms (e.g., a natural transformation between functors, which is a 2-morphism or a homotopy between paths). The homotopy coherent nerve $N^{hc}(C)$ of a simplicially-enriched category $C$ allows to capture such higher morphisms.

First we define $\mathfrak{C}[n]$ as a "thickened" version of the category $[n] = \{ 0, 1, \cdots, n \}$ ($[n]$ is a partially ordered set so can be viewed as a category). By definition, it has the same set of objects as $[n]$ does but the hom-simplicial-set from $i$ to $j$ is the nerve of $P_{i, j}$ where $P_{i, j}$ is the set of all subsets of $[i, j] = \{ k \mid i \le k \le j \}$ containing $i, j$ and is partially ordered by inclusion. That is, in $\mathfrak{C}[n]$, a morphism looks like $i \to k_1 \to \cdots \to j$ or none if $i > j$. (Formally, $\mathfrak{C}[n]$ is a cofibrant replacement of $[n]$.)

Then $N^{hc}(C)$ is defined to be the simplicial set where each n-simplex is a simplicially-enriched functor from $\mathfrak{C}[n]$ to $C$. Moreover, if $C$ has the property that $\operatorname{Map}(x, y)$ is a Kan complex for each pair of objects $x, y$, then $N^{hc}(C)$ is an ∞-category.

The functor $\mathfrak{C}[-]$ from sSet to sSet-Cat is then defined as the left adjoint to $N^{hc}$. An important application is:

Theorem— Let $C$ be a Top-enriched category (where Top is the category of compactly generated weak Hausdorff spaces). Then the counit map

$$|\operatorname{Map}_{\mathfrak{C}[N^{hc}S(C)]}(x, y)| \to \operatorname{Map}_C(x, y)$$

is a weak homotopy equivalence for each pair of objects $x, y$ in $C$, where $S(C)$ is the singular complex of $C$.

The theorem implies that a simplicial approach to the theory of ∞-categories is equivalent (in the above weak sense) to a topological approach to that.

== Constructions ==
If X, Y are ∞-categories, then the simplicial set $\underline{\operatorname{Hom}}(X, Y)$, the internal Hom in sSet, is also an ∞-category (more generally, it is an ∞-category if X is only a simplicial set and Y is an ∞-category.)

If $x, y$ are objects in an ∞-category C, then $\operatorname{Map}_C(x, y)$ is a Kan complex but $(x, y) \mapsto \operatorname{Map}_C(x, y)$ is a priori not a functor. A functor that restricts to it can be constructed as follows.

Let S be a simplicial set and $S' = \mathfrak{C}[S]$ the sSet-enriched category generated by it. Since $\operatorname{Hom}_{S'}$ is a functor, $(x, y) \mapsto \operatorname{Sing}|\operatorname{Hom}_C(x, y)|$ gives a functor

$$S'^{op} \times S' \to \mathrm{Kan}\, ,$$

where on the right is the 1-category of Kan complexes. Then, since $\mathfrak{C}[-]$ is a left adjoint to $N^{hc}$, $\mathfrak{C}[S^{op} \times S] \to S'^{op} \times S' \to \mathrm{Kan}$ corresponds to

$$S^{op} \times S \to \mathbf{Kan} = N^{hc}(\textrm{Kan}).$$

Taking $S$ to be an ∞-category C, the above is the hom functor

$$\operatorname{Hom} : C^{op} \times C \to \mathbf{Kan},$$

which restricts to $(x, y) \mapsto \operatorname{Map}_C(x, y).$

See also: limits and colimits in an ∞-category, core of an ∞-category.

== Equivalences between ∞-categories ==
Given a functor $F : C \to D$ between ∞-categories, F is said to be an equivalence (in the sense of Joyal) if it is invertible in ∞-Cat, the ∞-category of (small) ∞-categories.

Like in ordinary category theory, (with the presence of the axiom of choice), F is equivalence if and only if it is

- fully faithful, meaning $F : \operatorname{Map}(x, y) \to \operatorname{Map}(F(x), F(y))$ is equivalence for each pair of objects $x, y$, and
- essentially surjective, meaning for each object y in D, $y \simeq F(x)$ for some object x in C.

== Presheaves ==
Just like in ordinary category theory, one can consider a presheaf on an ∞-category C. From the point of view of higher category theory, such a presheaf should not be set-valued but space-valued (for example, for a correct formulation of the Yoneda lemma). The homotopy hypothesis says that one can take an ∞-groupoid, concretely a Kan complex, as a space. Given that, we take the category of "∞-presheaves" on C to be $\widehat{C} = \underline{\operatorname{Hom}}(C^{op}, \textbf{Kan})$ where $\textbf{Kan}$ is the ∞-category of Kan complexes. A category-valued presheaf is commonly called a prestack. Thus, $\widehat{C}$ can be thought of consisting of ∞-prestacks.

(With a choice of a functor structure on Hom), one then gets the ∞-Yoneda embedding as in the ordinary category case:

$$C \hookrightarrow \widehat{C}.$$

== Adjunctions ==
There are at least two equivalent approaches to adjunctions. In Cisinski's book, an adjunction is defined just as in ordinary category theory. Namely, two functors $F : C \to D, \, G : D \to C$ are said to be an adjoint pair if there exists a 2-morphism $c : \operatorname{Hom}(F, \operatorname{id)} \to \operatorname{Hom}(\operatorname{id}, G)$ such that the restriction to each pair of objects x in C, y in D,

$$c|_{x, y} : \operatorname{Map}_D(F(x), y) \to \operatorname{Map}_C(x, G(y))$$

is invertible in $\textbf{Kan}$ (recall the mapping spaces are Kan complexes).

In his book Higher Topos Theory, Lurie defines an adjunction to be a map $q : M \to \Delta^1$ that is both cartesian and cocartesian fibrations. Since $q$ is a cartesian fibration, by the Grothendieck construction of sort (straightening to be precise), one gets a functor

$$G : D = q^{-1}(1) \to D = q^{-1}(0).$$

Similarly, as $q$ is also a cocartesian fibration, there is also $F : C \to D.$ Then they are an adjoint pair and conversely, an adjoint pair determines an adjunction.

== Final objects and final maps ==
Let $\omega$ be an object in an ∞-category C. Then the following are equivalent:

- The constant functor with value $\omega$ is a final object in the category $\tau(\underline{\operatorname{Hom}}(X, C))$ for each simplicial set X.
- The mapping space $\operatorname{Map}(x, \omega)$ is contractible for each object x in C.
- The projection $C \downarrow \omega \to C$ is a trivial Joyal fibration.
- $\omega$ as a map $\Delta^0 \to C$ is a right anodyne extension.
- $\omega$ is the limit of a unique functor $\emptyset \to C$ from the empty set.

Then $\omega$ is said to be final if any of the above equivalent condition holds. The final objects form a full subcategory, an ∞-groupoid, that is either empty or contractible.

For example, a presheaf $F : C^{op} \to \textbf{Kan}$ is representable if and only if the ∞-category of elements for $F$ has a final object (as the representability amounts to saying the ∞-category of elements is equivalent to a comma category over C).

More generally, a map between simplicial sets is called final if it belongs the smallest class $\mathfrak{c}$ of maps satisfying the following:

- A right anodyne extension belongs to the class $\mathfrak{c}$.
- The class $\mathfrak{c}$ is stable under composition.
- If $f$ and $g \circ f$ are in $\mathfrak{c}$, then $g$ is in $\mathfrak{c}$.

Then an object $\omega$ is final if and only if the map $\omega : \Delta^0 \to C$ is a final map. Also, a map $f : X \to Y$ is called cofinal if $f : X^{op} \to Y^{op}$ is final.

== Presentable ∞-categories ==
Presheaf categories (discussed above) have some nice properties and their localizations also inherit such properties to some extent. An ∞-category is called presentable if it is a localization of a presheaf category on an ∞-category in the sense of Bousfield (the notion strongly depends on a choice of a universe, which is suppressed here. But one way to handle this issue is to manually keep track of cardinals. Another is to use the notion of an accessible ∞-category as done by Lurie).

Cisinski notes that “Any [reasonable] algebraic structure defines a presentable ∞-category," after taking a nerve. Thus, for example, "the category of groups, the category of abelian groups, the category of rings" are all (their nerves are) presentable ∞-categories. Also, the nerve of a category of small sets is presentable.

The notion has an implication to theory of model categories. Roughly because of the above remark, all the typical model categories that are used in practice have nerves that are presentable; such a model category is called combinatorial. Precisely, we have: (Dugger) if C is a combinatorial model category, then the localization $L(C)$ with respect to weak equivalences is a presentable ∞-category and conversely, each presentable ∞-category is of such form, up to equivalence.

== Variants ==
- An (∞, 1)-category is a not-necessarily-quasi-category ∞-category in which all n-morphisms for n > 1 are equivalences. There are several models of (∞, 1)-categories, including Segal category, simplicially enriched category, topological category, complete Segal space. A quasi-category is also an (∞, 1)-category.
- Model structure There is a model structure on sSet-categories that presents the (∞,1)-category (∞,1)Cat.
- Homotopy Kan extension The notion of homotopy Kan extension and hence in particular that of homotopy limit and homotopy colimit has a direct formulation in terms of Kan-complex-enriched categories. See homotopy Kan extension for more.
- Presentation of (∞,1)-topos theory All of (∞,1)-topos theory can be modeled in terms of sSet-categories. (ToënVezzosi). There is a notion of sSet-site C that models the notion of (∞,1)-site and a model structure on sSet-enriched presheaves on sSet-sites that is a presentation for the ∞-stack (∞,1)-toposes on C.

== See also ==
- Model category
- Stable infinity category
- ∞-groupoid
- Higher category theory
- Globular set
- Mackey functor
- (∞, n)-category
- Homotopy coherent nerve
- Localization of an ∞-category
