= Simplicial set =

Mathematical construction used in homotopy theory

In mathematics, a simplicial set is a sequence of sets with internal order structure (abstract simplices) and maps between them. Simplicial sets are higher-dimensional generalizations of directed graphs.

Every simplicial set gives rise to a "nice" topological space, known as its geometric realization. This realization consists of geometric simplices, glued together according to the rules of the simplicial set. Indeed, one may view a simplicial set as a purely combinatorial construction designed to capture the essence of a topological space for the purposes of homotopy theory. Specifically, the category of simplicial sets carries a natural model structure, and the corresponding homotopy category is equivalent to the familiar homotopy category of topological spaces.

Formally, a simplicial set may be defined as a contravariant functor from the simplex category to the category of sets. Simplicial sets were introduced in 1950 by Samuel Eilenberg and Joseph A. Zilber.

Simplicial sets are used to define quasi-categories, a basic notion of higher category theory. A construction analogous to that of simplicial sets can be carried out in any category, not just in the category of sets, yielding the notion of simplicial objects.

== Motivation ==
A simplicial set is a categorical (that is, purely algebraic) model capturing those topological spaces that can be built up (or faithfully represented up to homotopy) from simplices and their incidence relations. This is similar to the approach of CW complexes to modeling topological spaces, with the crucial difference that simplicial sets are purely algebraic and do not carry any actual topology.

To get back to actual topological spaces, there is a geometric realization functor which turns simplicial sets into compactly generated Hausdorff spaces. Most classical results on CW complexes in homotopy theory are generalized by analogous results for simplicial sets. While algebraic topologists largely continue to prefer CW complexes, there is a growing contingent of researchers interested in using simplicial sets for applications in algebraic geometry where CW complexes do not naturally exist.

== Intuition ==
Simplicial sets can be viewed as a higher-dimensional generalization of directed multigraphs. A simplicial set contains vertices (known as "0-simplices" in this context) and arrows ("1-simplices") between some of these vertices. Two vertices may be connected by several arrows, and directed loops that connect a vertex to itself are also allowed. Unlike directed multigraphs, simplicial sets may also contain higher simplices. A 2-simplex, for instance, can be thought of as a two-dimensional "triangular" shape bounded by a list of three vertices A, B, C and three arrows B → C, A → C and A → B. In general, an n-simplex is an object made up from a list of n + 1 vertices (which are 0-simplices) and n + 1 faces (which are (n − 1)-simplices). The vertices of the i-th face are the vertices of the n-simplex minus the i-th vertex. The vertices of a simplex need not be distinct and a simplex is not determined by its vertices and faces: two different simplices may share the same list of faces (and therefore the same list of vertices), just like two different arrows in a multigraph may connect the same two vertices.

Simplicial sets should not be confused with abstract simplicial complexes, which generalize simple undirected graphs rather than directed multigraphs.

Formally, a simplicial set X is a collection of sets X_{n}, n = 0, 1, 2, ..., together with certain maps between these sets: the face maps d_{n,i} : X_{n} → X_{n−1} (n = 1, 2, 3, ... and 0 ≤ i ≤ n) and degeneracy maps s_{n,i} : X_{n}→X_{n+1} (n = 0, 1, 2, ... and 0 ≤ i ≤ n). We think of the elements of X_{n} as the n-simplices of X. The map d_{n,i} assigns to each such n-simplex its i-th face, the face "opposite to" (i.e. not containing) the i-th vertex. The map s_{n,i} assigns to each n-simplex the degenerate (n+1)-simplex which arises from the given one by duplicating the i-th vertex. This description implicitly requires certain consistency relations among the maps d_{n,i} and s_{n,i}.

Rather than requiring these simplicial identities explicitly as part of the definition, the short modern definition uses the language of category theory.

== Formal definition ==
Let Δ denote the simplex category. The objects of Δ are nonempty totally ordered finite sets, and the morphisms (non-strictly) order-preserving functions. Each object is uniquely isomorphic to an object of the form

[n] = {0, 1, ..., n}

with n ≥ 0.

A simplicial set X is a contravariant functor

X : Δ → Set

where Set is the category of sets. (Alternatively and equivalently, one may define simplicial sets as covariant functors from the opposite category Δ^{op} → Set.) Given a simplicial set X, we often write X_{n} instead of X([n]).

Simplicial sets form a category, usually denoted sSet, whose objects are simplicial sets and whose morphisms are natural transformations between them. This is the category of presheaves on Δ. As such, it is a Grothendieck topos.

=== Face and degeneracy maps and simplicial identities ===
The morphisms (maps) of the simplex category Δ are generated by two particularly important families of morphisms, whose images under a given simplicial set functor are called the face maps and degeneracy maps of that simplicial set.

The face maps of a simplicial set X are the images in that simplicial set of the morphisms $\delta^{n,0},\dotsc,\delta^{n,n}\colon[n-1]\to[n]$, where $\delta^{n,i}$ is the only (order-preserving) injection $[n-1]\to[n]$ that "misses" $i$. Let us denote these face maps by $d_{n,0},\dotsc,d_{n,n}$ respectively, so that $d_{n,i}$ is a map $X_n \to X_{n-1}$. If the first index is clear, we write $d_i$ instead of $d_{n,i}$.

The degeneracy maps of the simplicial set X are the images in that simplicial set of the morphisms $\sigma^{n,0},\dotsc,\sigma^{n,n}\colon[n+1]\to[n]$, where $\sigma^{n,i}$ is the only (order-preserving) surjection $[n+1]\to[n]$ that "hits" $i$ twice. Let us denote these degeneracy maps by $s_{n,0},\dotsc,s_{n,n}$ respectively, so that $s_{n,i}$ is a map $X_n \to X_{n+1}$. If the first index is clear, we write $s_i$ instead of $s_{n,i}$.

The defined maps satisfy the following simplicial identities:

1. $d_i d_j = d_{j-1} d_i$ if i < j. (This is short for $d_{n-1,i} d_{n,j} = d_{n-1,j-1} d_{n,i}$ if 0 ≤ i < j ≤ n.)
2. $d_i s_j = s_{j-1}d_i$ if i < j.
3. $d_i s_j = \text{id}$ if i = j or i = j + 1.
4. $d_i s_j = s_j d_{i-1}$ if i > j + 1.
5. $s_i s_j = s_{j+1} s_i$ if i ≤ j.

Conversely, given a sequence of sets X_{n} together with maps $d_{n,i} : X_n \to X_{n-1}$ and $s_{n,i} : X_n \to X_{n+1}$ that satisfy the simplicial identities, there is a unique simplicial set X that has these face and degeneracy maps. So the identities provide an alternative way to define simplicial sets.

== Examples ==
Given a partially ordered set (S, ≤), we can define a simplicial set NS, called the nerve of S, as follows: for every object [n] of Δ we set NS([n]) = hom_{poset}( [n] , S), the set of order-preserving maps from [n] to S. Every morphism φ: [n] → [m] in Δ is an order preserving map, and via composition induces a map NS(φ) : NS([m]) → NS([n]). It is straightforward to check that NS is a contravariant functor from Δ to Set: a simplicial set.

Concretely, the n-simplices of the nerve NS, i.e. the elements of NS_{n} = NS([n]), can be thought of as ordered length-(n+1) sequences of elements from S: (a_{0} ≤ a_{1} ≤ ... ≤ a_{n}). The face map d_{i} drops the i-th element from such a list, and the degeneracy maps s_{i} duplicates the i-th element.

A similar construction can be performed for every category C, to obtain the nerve NC of C. Here, NC([n]) is the set of all functors from [n] to C, where we consider [n] as a category with objects 0,1,...,n and a single morphism from i to j whenever i ≤ j.

Concretely, the n-simplices of the nerve NC can be thought of as sequences of n composable morphisms in C: a_{0} → a_{1} → ... → a_{n}. (In particular, the 0-simplices are the objects of C and the 1-simplices are the morphisms of C.) The face map d_{0} drops the first morphism from such a list, the face map d_{n} drops the last, and the face map d_{i} for 0 < i < n drops a_{i} and composes the i-th and (i + 1)-th morphisms. The degeneracy maps s_{i} lengthen the sequence by inserting an identity morphism at position i.

We can recover the poset S from the nerve NS and the category C from the nerve NC; in this sense simplicial sets generalize posets and categories.

Another important class of examples of simplicial sets is given by the singular set SY of a topological space Y. Here SY_{n} consists of all the continuous maps from the standard topological n-simplex to Y. The singular set is further explained below.

== The standard n-simplex and the category of simplices ==
The standard n-simplex, denoted Δ^{n}, is a simplicial set defined as the functor hom_{Δ}(-, [n]) where [n] denotes the ordered set {0, 1, ... ,n} of the first (n + 1) nonnegative integers. (In many texts, it is written instead as hom([n],-) where the homset is understood to be in the opposite category Δ^{op}.)

By the Yoneda lemma, the n-simplices of a simplicial set X stand in 1–1 correspondence with the natural transformations from Δ^{n} to X, i.e. $X_n = X([n])\cong \operatorname{Nat}(\operatorname{hom}_\Delta(-,[n]),X)= \operatorname{hom}_{\textbf{sSet}}(\Delta^n,X)$.

Furthermore, X gives rise to a category of simplices, denoted by $\Delta\downarrow{X}$ , whose objects are maps (i.e. natural transformations) Δ^{n} → X and whose morphisms are natural transformations Δ^{n} → Δ^{m} over X arising from maps [n] → [m] in Δ. That is, $\Delta\downarrow{X}$ is a slice category of Δ over X. The following isomorphism shows that a simplicial set X is a colimit of its simplices:

$$X \cong \varinjlim_{\Delta^n \to X} \Delta^n$$

where the colimit is taken over the category of simplices of X.

== Geometric realization ==
There is a functor |•|: sSet → CGHaus called the geometric realization taking a simplicial set X to its corresponding realization in the category CGHaus of compactly-generated Hausdorff topological spaces. Intuitively, the realization of X is the topological space (in fact a CW complex) obtained if every n-simplex of X is replaced by a topological n-simplex (a certain n-dimensional subset of (n + 1)-dimensional Euclidean space defined below) and these topological simplices are glued together in the fashion the simplices of X hang together. In this process the orientation of the simplices of X is lost.

To define the realization functor, we first define it on standard n-simplices Δ^{n} as follows: the geometric realization |Δ^{n}| is the standard topological n-simplex in general position given by

$$|\Delta^n| = \{(x_0, \dots, x_n) \in \mathbb{R}^{n+1}: 0\leq x_i \leq 1, \sum x_i = 1 \}.$$

The definition then naturally extends to any simplicial set X by setting

|X| = lim_{Δ^{n} → X} | Δ^{n}|

where the colimit is taken over the n-simplex category of X. The geometric realization is functorial on sSet.

It is significant that we use the category CGHaus of compactly-generated Hausdorff spaces, rather than the category Top of topological spaces, as the target category of geometric realization: like sSet and unlike Top, the category CGHaus is cartesian closed; the categorical product is defined differently in the categories Top and CGHaus, and the one in CGHaus corresponds to the one in sSet via geometric realization.

== Singular set for a space ==
The singular set of a topological space Y is the simplicial set SY defined by

(SY)([n]) = hom_{Top}(|Δ^{n}|, Y) for each object [n] ∈ Δ.

Every order-preserving map φ:[n]→[m] induces a continuous map |Δ^{n}|→|Δ^{m}| by

$$(x_0,...,x_n) \in |\Delta_n| \mapsto (y_j),~~ y_j = \sum_{\phi(i) =j}x_i.$$

Then, by composition it yields to a map SY(φ) : SY([m]) → SY([n]). This definition is analogous to a standard idea in singular homology of "probing" a target topological space with standard topological n-simplices. Furthermore, the singular functor S is right adjoint to the geometric realization functor described above, i.e.:

hom_{Top}(|X|, Y) ≅ hom_{sSet}(X, SY)

for any simplicial set X and any topological space Y. Intuitively, this adjunction can be understood as follows: a continuous map from the geometric realization of X to a space Y is uniquely specified if we associate to every simplex of X a continuous map from the corresponding standard topological simplex to Y, in such a fashion that these maps are compatible with the way the simplices in X hang together.

== Homotopy theory of simplicial sets ==
In order to define a model structure on the category of simplicial sets, one has to define fibrations, cofibrations and weak equivalences. One can define fibrations to be Kan fibrations. A map of simplicial sets is defined to be a weak equivalence if its geometric realization is a weak homotopy equivalence of spaces. A map of simplicial sets is defined to be a cofibration if it is a monomorphism of simplicial sets. It is a difficult theorem of Daniel Quillen that the category of simplicial sets with these classes of morphisms becomes a model category, and indeed satisfies the axioms for a proper closed simplicial model category.

A key turning point of the theory is that the geometric realization of a Kan fibration is a Serre fibration of spaces. With the model structure in place, a homotopy theory of simplicial sets can be developed using standard homotopical algebra methods. Furthermore, the geometric realization and singular functors give a Quillen equivalence of closed model categories inducing an equivalence

|•|: Ho(sSet) ↔ Ho(Top)

between the homotopy category for simplicial sets and the usual homotopy category of CW complexes with homotopy classes of continuous maps between them. It is part of the general definition of a Quillen adjunction that the right adjoint functor (in this case, the singular set functor) carries fibrations (resp. trivial fibrations) to fibrations (resp. trivial fibrations).

== Simplicial objects ==
A simplicial object X in a category C is a contravariant functor

X : Δ → C

or equivalently a covariant functor

X: Δ^{op} → C,

where Δ still denotes the simplex category and ^{op} the opposite category. When C is the category of sets, we are just talking about the simplicial sets that were defined above. Letting C be the category of groups or category of abelian groups, we obtain the categories sGrp of simplicial groups and sAb of simplicial abelian groups, respectively.

Simplicial groups and simplicial abelian groups also carry closed model structures induced by that of the underlying simplicial sets.

The homotopy groups of simplicial abelian groups can be computed by making use of the Dold–Kan correspondence which yields an equivalence of categories between simplicial abelian groups and bounded chain complexes and is given by functors

N: sAb → Ch_{+}

and

Γ: Ch_{+} → sAb.

See also: simplicial diagram.

== History and uses of simplicial sets ==
Simplicial sets were originally used to give precise and convenient descriptions of classifying spaces of groups. This idea was vastly extended by Grothendieck's idea of considering classifying spaces of categories, and in particular by Quillen's work of algebraic K-theory. In this work, which earned him a Fields Medal, Quillen developed surprisingly efficient methods for manipulating infinite simplicial sets. These methods were used in other areas on the border between algebraic geometry and topology. For instance, the André–Quillen homology of a ring is a "non-abelian homology", defined and studied in this way.

Both the algebraic K-theory and the André–Quillen homology are defined using algebraic data to write down a simplicial set, and then taking the homotopy groups of this simplicial set.

Simplicial methods are often useful when one wants to prove that a space is a loop space. The basic idea is that if $G$ is a group with classifying space $BG$, then $G$ is homotopy equivalent to the loop space $\Omega BG$. If $BG$ itself is a group, we can iterate the procedure, and $G$ is homotopy equivalent to the double loop space $\Omega^2 B(BG)$. In case $G$ is an abelian group, we can actually iterate this infinitely many times, and obtain that $G$ is an infinite loop space.

Even if $X$ is not an abelian group, it can happen that it has a composition which is sufficiently commutative so that one can use the above idea to prove that $X$ is an infinite loop space. In this way, one can prove that the algebraic $K$-theory of a ring, considered as a topological space, is an infinite loop space.

In recent years, simplicial sets have been used in higher category theory and derived algebraic geometry. Quasi-categories can be thought of as categories in which the composition of morphisms is defined only up to homotopy, and information about the composition of higher homotopies is also retained. Quasi-categories are defined as simplicial sets satisfying one additional condition, the weak Kan condition.

== See also ==
- Delta set
- Dendroidal set, a generalization of simplicial set
- Simplicial presheaf
- Quasi-category
- Kan complex
- Dold–Kan correspondence
- Simplicial homotopy
- Simplicial sphere
- Abstract simplicial complex
- Anodyne extension
- Weak equivalence between simplicial sets
