= Simplex category =

Category of non-empty finite ordinals and order-preserving maps

In mathematics, the simplex category (or simplicial category or nonempty finite ordinal category) is the category of non-empty finite ordinals and order-preserving maps. It is used to define simplicial and cosimplicial objects.

== Formal definition ==
The simplex category is usually denoted by $\Delta$. There are several equivalent descriptions of this category. $\Delta$ can be described as the category of non-empty finite ordinals as objects, thought of as totally ordered sets, and (non-strictly) order-preserving functions as morphisms. The objects are commonly denoted $[n] = \{0, 1, \dots, n\}$ (so that $[n]$ is the ordinal $n+1$). The category is generated by coface and codegeneracy maps, which amount to inserting or deleting elements of the orderings. (See simplicial set for relations of these maps.)

A simplicial object is a presheaf on $\Delta$, that is a contravariant functor from $\Delta$ to another category. For instance, simplicial sets are contravariant with the codomain category being the category of sets. A cosimplicial object is defined similarly as a covariant functor originating from $\Delta$.

== Augmented simplex category ==
The augmented simplex category, denoted by $\Delta_+$ is the category of all finite ordinals and order-preserving maps, thus $\Delta_+=\Delta\cup [-1]$, where $[-1]=\emptyset$. Accordingly, this category might also be denoted FinOrd. The augmented simplex category is occasionally referred to as algebraists' simplex category and the above version is called topologists' simplex category.

A contravariant functor defined on $\Delta_+$ is called an augmented simplicial object and a covariant functor out of $\Delta_+$ is called an augmented cosimplicial object; when the codomain category is the category of sets, for example, these are called augmented simplicial sets and augmented cosimplicial sets respectively.

The augmented simplex category, unlike the simplex category, admits a natural monoidal structure. The monoidal product is given by concatenation of linear orders, and the unit is the empty ordinal $[-1]$ (the lack of a unit prevents this from qualifying as a monoidal structure on $\Delta$). In fact, $\Delta_+$ is the monoidal category freely generated by a single monoid object, given by $[0]$ with the unique possible unit and multiplication. This description is useful for understanding how any comonoid object in a monoidal category gives rise to a simplicial object since it can then be viewed as the image of a functor from $\Delta_+^\text{op}$ to the monoidal category containing the comonoid; by forgetting the augmentation we obtain a simplicial object. Similarly, this also illuminates the construction of simplicial objects from monads (and hence adjoint functors) since monads can be viewed as monoid objects in endofunctor categories.

== See also ==
- Simplicial category
- PROP (category theory)
- Abstract simplicial complex
