= Homotopy Lie algebra =

In mathematics, in particular abstract algebra and topology, a homotopy Lie algebra (or $L_\infty$-algebra) is a generalisation of the concept of a differential graded Lie algebra. To be a little more specific, the Jacobi identity only holds up to homotopy. Therefore, a differential graded Lie algebra can be seen as a homotopy Lie algebra where the Jacobi identity holds on the nose. These homotopy algebras are useful in classifying deformation problems over characteristic 0 in deformation theory because deformation functors are classified by quasi-isomorphism classes of $L_\infty$-algebras. This was later extended to all characteristics by Jonathan Pridham.

Homotopy Lie algebras have applications within mathematics and mathematical physics; they are linked, for instance, to the Batalin–Vilkovisky formalism much like differential graded Lie algebras are.

== Definition ==
There exists several different definitions of a homotopy Lie algebra, some particularly suited to certain situations more than others. The most traditional definition is via symmetric multi-linear maps, but there also exists a more succinct geometric definition using the language of formal geometry. Here the blanket assumption that the underlying field is of characteristic zero is made.

=== Geometric definition ===
A homotopy Lie algebra on a graded vector space $V = \bigoplus V_i$ is a continuous derivation, $m$, of order $>1$ that squares to zero on the formal manifold $\hat{S}\Sigma V^*$. Here $\hat{S}$ is the completed symmetric algebra, $\Sigma$ is the suspension of a graded vector space, and $V^*$ denotes the linear dual. Typically one describes $(V,m)$ as the homotopy Lie algebra and $\hat{S}\Sigma V^*$ with the differential $m$ as its representing commutative differential graded algebra.

Using this definition of a homotopy Lie algebra, one defines a morphism of homotopy Lie algebras, $f\colon(V,m_V)\to (W,m_W)$, as a morphism $f\colon\hat{S}\Sigma V^*\to\hat{S}\Sigma W^*$ of their representing commutative differential graded algebras that commutes with the vector field, i.e., $f \circ m_V = m_W \circ f$. Homotopy Lie algebras and their morphisms define a category.

=== Definition via multi-linear maps ===
The more traditional definition of a homotopy Lie algebra is through an infinite collection of symmetric multi-linear maps that is sometimes referred to as the definition via higher brackets. It should be stated that the two definitions are equivalent.

A homotopy Lie algebra on a graded vector space $V = \bigoplus V_i$ is a collection of symmetric multi-linear maps $l_n \colon V^{\otimes n}\to V$ of degree $n-2$, sometimes called the $n$-ary bracket, for each $n\in\N$. Moreover, the maps $l_n$ satisfy the generalised Jacobi identity:

$$\sum_{i+j=n+1} \sum_{\sigma\in \mathrm{UnShuff}(i,n-i)}  \chi (\sigma ,v_1 ,\dots ,v_n ) (-1)^{i(j-1)} l_j (l_i (v_{\sigma (1)} , \dots ,v_{\sigma (i)}),v_{\sigma (i+1)}, \dots ,v_{\sigma (n)})=0,$$

for each n. Here the inner sum runs over $(i,j)$-unshuffles and $\chi$ is the signature of the permutation. The above formula have meaningful interpretations for low values of $n$; for instance, when $n=1$ it is saying that $l_1$ squares to zero (i.e., it is a differential on $V$), when $n=2$ it is saying that $l_1$ is a derivation of $l_2$, and when $n=3$ it is saying that $l_2$ satisfies the Jacobi identity up to an exact term of $l_3$ (i.e., it holds up to homotopy). Notice that when the higher brackets $l_n$ for $n\geq 3$ vanish, the definition of a differential graded Lie algebra on $V$ is recovered.

Using the approach via multi-linear maps, a morphism of homotopy Lie algebras can be defined by a collection of symmetric multi-linear maps $f_n\colon V^{\otimes n} \to W$ which satisfy certain conditions.

=== Definition via operads ===
There also exists a more abstract definition of a homotopy algebra using the theory of operads: that is, a homotopy Lie algebra is an algebra over an operad in the category of chain complexes over the $L_\infty$ operad.

== (Quasi) isomorphisms and minimal models ==
A morphism of homotopy Lie algebras is said to be a (quasi) isomorphism if its linear component $f\colon V\to W$ is a (quasi) isomorphism, where the differentials of $V$ and $W$ are just the linear components of $m_V$ and $m_W$.

An important special class of homotopy Lie algebras are the so-called minimal homotopy Lie algebras, which are characterized by the vanishing of their linear component $l_1$. This means that any quasi isomorphism of minimal homotopy Lie algebras must be an isomorphism. Any homotopy Lie algebra is quasi-isomorphic to a minimal one, which must be unique up to isomorphism and it is therefore called its minimal model.

== Examples ==
Because $L_\infty$-algebras have such a complex structure describing even simple cases can be a non-trivial task in most cases. Fortunately, there are the simple cases coming from differential graded Lie algebras and cases coming from finite dimensional examples.

=== Differential graded Lie algebras ===
One of the approachable classes of examples of $L_\infty$-algebras come from the embedding of differential graded Lie algebras into the category of $L_\infty$-algebras. This can be described by $l_1$ giving the derivation, $l_2$ the Lie algebra structure, and $l_k =0$ for the rest of the maps.

=== Two term L_{∞} algebras ===
==== In degrees 0 and 1 ====
One notable class of examples are $L_\infty$-algebras which only have two nonzero underlying vector spaces $V_0,V_1$. Then, cranking out the definition for $L_\infty$-algebras this means there is a linear map

$$d\colon V_1 \to V_0$$,

bilinear maps

$l_2\colon V_i\times V_j \to V_{i+j}$, where $0\leq i + j \leq 1$,

and a trilinear map

$$l_3\colon V_0\times V_0\times V_0 \to V_1$$

which satisfy a host of identities. ^{pg 28} In particular, the map $l_2$ on $V_0\times V_0 \to V_0$ implies it has a lie algebra structure up to a homotopy. This is given by the differential of $l_3$ since the gives the $L_\infty$-algebra structure implies

$$dl_3(a,b,c) = -[[a,b],c] + [[a,c],b] + [a,[b,c]]$$,

showing it is a higher Lie bracket. In fact, some authors write the maps $l_n$ as $[-,\cdots,-]_n: V_\bullet \to V_\bullet$, so the previous equation could be read as

$$d[a,b,c]_3 = -[[a,b],c] + [[a,c],b] + [a,[b,c]]$$,

showing that the differential of the 3-bracket gives the failure for the 2-bracket to be a Lie algebra structure. It is only a Lie algebra up to homotopy. If we took the complex $H_*(V_\bullet, d)$ then $H_0(V_\bullet, d)$ has a structure of a Lie algebra from the induced map of $[-,-]_2$.

==== In degrees 0 and n ====
In this case, for $n \geq 2$, there is no differential, so $V_0$ is a Lie algebra on the nose, but, there is the extra data of a vector space $V_n$ in degree $n$ and a higher bracket

$$l_{n+2}\colon \bigoplus^{n+2} V_0 \to V_n.$$

It turns out this higher bracket is in fact a higher cocyle in Lie algebra cohomology. More specifically, if we rewrite $V_0$ as the Lie algebra $\mathfrak{g}$ and $V_n$ and a Lie algebra representation $V$ (given by structure map $\rho$), then there is a bijection of quadruples

$(\mathfrak{g}, V, \rho, l_{n+2})$ where $l_{n+2}\colon \mathfrak{g}^{\otimes n+2} \to V$ is an $(n+2)$-cocycle

and the two-term $L_\infty$-algebras with non-zero vector spaces in degrees $0$ and $n$.^{pg 42} Note this situation is highly analogous to the relation between group cohomology and the structure of n-groups with two non-trivial homotopy groups. For the case of term term $L_\infty$-algebras in degrees $0$ and $1$ there is a similar relation between Lie algebra cocycles and such higher brackets. Upon first inspection, it's not an obvious results, but it becomes clear after looking at the homology complex

$$H_*(V_1 \xrightarrow{d} V_0)$$,

so the differential becomes trivial. This gives an equivalent $L_\infty$-algebra which can then be analyzed as before.

==== Example in degrees 0 and 1 ====
One simple example of a Lie-2 algebra is given by the $L_\infty$-algebra with $V_0= (\R^3,\times)$ where $\times$ is the cross-product of vectors and $V_1=\R$ is the trivial representation. Then, there is a higher bracket $l_3$ given by the dot product of vectors

$$l_3(a,b,c) = a\cdot (b\times c).$$

It can be checked the differential of this $L_\infty$-algebra is always zero using basic linear algebra^{pg 45}.

=== Finite dimensional example ===
Coming up with simple examples for the sake of studying the nature of $L_\infty$-algebras is a complex problem. For example, given a graded vector space $V = V_0 \oplus V_1$ where $V_0$ has basis given by the vector $w$ and $V_1$ has the basis given by the vectors $v_1, v_2$, there is an $L_\infty$-algebra structure given by the following rules

$$\begin{align}
& l_1(v_1) = l_1(v_2) = w \\
& l_2(v_1\otimes v_2) = v_1, l_2(v_1\otimes w) = w \\
& l_n(v_2\otimes w^{\otimes n-1}) = C_nw \text{ for } n \geq 3
\end{align},$$

where $C_n = (-1)^{n-1}(n-3)C_{n-1}, C_3 = 1$. Note that the first few constants are

$$\begin{matrix}
C_3 & C_4 & C_5 & C_6 \\
1 & -1 & -2 & 12
\end{matrix}$$

Since $l_1(w)$ should be of degree $-1$, the axioms imply that $l_1(w) = 0$. There are other similar examples for super Lie algebras. Furthermore, $L_\infty$ structures on graded vector spaces whose underlying vector space is two dimensional have been completely classified.

== See also ==
- Homotopy associative algebra
- Differential graded algebra
- BV formalism
- Simplicial Lie algebra
- Hochschild homology
- Deformation quantization
- Lie n-algebra
