= Semiorthogonal decomposition =

In mathematics, a semiorthogonal decomposition is a way to divide a triangulated category into simpler pieces. One way to produce a semiorthogonal decomposition is from an exceptional collection, a special sequence of objects in a triangulated category. For an algebraic variety X, it has been fruitful to study semiorthogonal decompositions of the bounded derived category of coherent sheaves, $\text{D}^{\text{b}}(X)$.

== Semiorthogonal decomposition ==
Alexei Bondal and Mikhail Kapranov (1989) defined a semiorthogonal decomposition of a triangulated category $\mathcal{T}$ to be a sequence $\mathcal{A}_1,\ldots,\mathcal{A}_n$ of strictly full triangulated subcategories such that:

- for all $1\leq i<j\leq n$ and all objects $A_i\in\mathcal{A}_i$ and $A_j\in\mathcal{A}_j$, every morphism from $A_j$ to $A_i$ is zero. That is, there are "no morphisms from right to left".
- $\mathcal{T}$ is generated by $\mathcal{A}_1,\ldots,\mathcal{A}_n$. That is, the smallest strictly full triangulated subcategory of $\mathcal{T}$ containing $\mathcal{A}_1,\ldots,\mathcal{A}_n$ is equal to $\mathcal{T}$.

The notation $\mathcal{T}=\langle\mathcal{A}_1,\ldots,\mathcal{A}_n\rangle$ is used for a semiorthogonal decomposition.

Having a semiorthogonal decomposition implies that every object of $\mathcal{T}$ has a canonical "filtration" whose graded pieces are (successively) in the subcategories $\mathcal{A}_1,\ldots,\mathcal{A}_n$. That is, for each object T of $\mathcal{T}$, there is a sequence

$$0=T_n\to T_{n-1}\to\cdots\to T_0=T$$

of morphisms in $\mathcal{T}$ such that the cone of $T_i\to T_{i-1}$ is in $\mathcal{A}_i$, for each i. Moreover, this sequence is unique up to a unique isomorphism.

One can also consider "orthogonal" decompositions of a triangulated category, by requiring that there are no morphisms from $\mathcal{A}_i$ to $\mathcal{A}_j$ for any $i\neq j$. However, that property is too strong for most purposes. For example, for an (irreducible) smooth projective variety X over a field, the bounded derived category $\text{D}^{\text{b}}(X)$ of coherent sheaves never has a nontrivial orthogonal decomposition, whereas it may have a semiorthogonal decomposition, by the examples below.

A semiorthogonal decomposition of a triangulated category may be considered as analogous to a finite filtration of an abelian group. Alternatively, one may consider a semiorthogonal decomposition $\mathcal{T}=\langle\mathcal{A},\mathcal{B}\rangle$ as closer to a split exact sequence, because the exact sequence $0\to\mathcal{A}\to\mathcal{T}\to\mathcal{T}/\mathcal{A}\to 0$ of triangulated categories is split by the subcategory $\mathcal{B}\subset \mathcal{T}$, mapping isomorphically to $\mathcal{T}/\mathcal{A}$.

Using that observation, a semiorthogonal decomposition $\mathcal{T}=\langle\mathcal{A}_1,\ldots,\mathcal{A}_n\rangle$ implies a direct sum splitting of Grothendieck groups:

$$K_0(\mathcal{T})\cong K_0(\mathcal{A}_1)\oplus\cdots\oplus K_0(\mathcal{A_n}).$$

For example, when $\mathcal{T}=\text{D}^{\text{b}}(X)$ is the bounded derived category of coherent sheaves on a smooth projective variety X, $K_0(\mathcal{T})$ can be identified with the Grothendieck group $K_0(X)$ of algebraic vector bundles on X. In this geometric situation, using that $\text{D}^{\text{b}}(X)$ comes from a dg-category, a semiorthogonal decomposition actually gives a splitting of all the algebraic K-groups of X:

$$K_i(X)\cong K_i(\mathcal{A}_1)\oplus\cdots\oplus K_i(\mathcal{A_n})$$

for all i.

== Admissible subcategory ==
One way to produce a semiorthogonal decomposition is from an admissible subcategory. By definition, a full triangulated subcategory $\mathcal{A}\subset\mathcal{T}$ is left admissible if the inclusion functor $i\colon\mathcal{A}\to\mathcal{T}$ has a left adjoint functor, written $i^*$. Likewise, $\mathcal{A}\subset\mathcal{T}$ is right admissible if the inclusion has a right adjoint, written $i^!$, and it is admissible if it is both left and right admissible.

A right admissible subcategory $\mathcal{B}\subset\mathcal{T}$ determines a semiorthogonal decomposition

$$\mathcal{T}=\langle\mathcal{B}^{\perp},\mathcal{B}\rangle$$,

where

$$\mathcal{B}^{\perp}:=\{T\in\mathcal{T}: \operatorname{Hom}(\mathcal{B},T)=0\}$$

is the right orthogonal of $\mathcal{B}$ in $\mathcal{T}$. Conversely, every semiorthogonal decomposition $\mathcal{T}=\langle \mathcal{A},\mathcal{B}\rangle$ arises in this way, in the sense that $\mathcal{B}$ is right admissible and $\mathcal{A}=\mathcal{B}^{\perp}$. Likewise, for any semiorthogonal decomposition $\mathcal{T}=\langle \mathcal{A},\mathcal{B}\rangle$, the subcategory $\mathcal{A}$ is left admissible, and $\mathcal{B}={}^{\perp}\mathcal{A}$, where

$${}^{\perp}\mathcal{A}:=\{T\in\mathcal{T}: \operatorname{Hom}(T,\mathcal{A})=0\}$$

is the left orthogonal of $\mathcal{A}$.

If $\mathcal{T}$ is the bounded derived category of a smooth projective variety over a field k, then every left or right admissible subcategory of $\mathcal{T}$ is in fact admissible. By results of Bondal and Michel Van den Bergh, this holds more generally for $\mathcal{T}$ any regular proper triangulated category that is idempotent-complete.

Moreover, for a regular proper idempotent-complete triangulated category $\mathcal{T}$, a full triangulated subcategory is admissible if and only if it is regular and idempotent-complete. These properties are intrinsic to the subcategory. For example, for X a smooth projective variety and Y a subvariety not equal to X, the subcategory of $\text{D}^{\text{b}}(X)$ of objects supported on Y is not admissible.

== Exceptional collection ==
Let k be a field, and let $\mathcal{T}$ be a k-linear triangulated category. An object E of $\mathcal{T}$ is called exceptional if Hom(E,E) = k and Hom(E,E[t]) = 0 for all nonzero integers t, where [t] is the shift functor in $\mathcal{T}$. (In the derived category of a smooth complex projective variety X, the first-order deformation space of an object E is $\operatorname{Ext}^1_X(E,E)\cong \operatorname{Hom}(E,E[1])$, and so an exceptional object is in particular rigid. It follows, for example, that there are at most countably many exceptional objects in $\text{D}^{\text{b}}(X)$, up to isomorphism. That helps to explain the name.)

The triangulated subcategory generated by an exceptional object E is equivalent to the derived category $\text{D}^{\text{b}}(k)$ of finite-dimensional k-vector spaces, the simplest triangulated category in this context. (For example, every object of that subcategory is isomorphic to a finite direct sum of shifts of E.)

Alexei Gorodentsev and Alexei Rudakov (1987) defined an exceptional collection to be a sequence of exceptional objects $E_1,\ldots,E_m$ such that $\operatorname{Hom}(E_j,E_i[t])=0$ for all i < j and all integers t. (That is, there are "no morphisms from right to left".) In a proper triangulated category $\mathcal{T}$ over k, such as the bounded derived category of coherent sheaves on a smooth projective variety, every exceptional collection generates an admissible subcategory, and so it determines a semiorthogonal decomposition:

$$\mathcal{T}=\langle\mathcal{A},E_1,\ldots,E_m\rangle,$$

where $\mathcal{A}=\langle E_1,\ldots,E_m\rangle^{\perp}$, and $E_i$ denotes the full triangulated subcategory generated by the object $E_i$. An exceptional collection is called full if the subcategory $\mathcal{A}$ is zero. (Thus a full exceptional collection breaks the whole triangulated category up into finitely many copies of $\text{D}^{\text{b}}(k)$.)

In particular, if X is a smooth projective variety such that $\text{D}^{\text{b}}(X)$ has a full exceptional collection $E_1,\ldots,E_m$, then the Grothendieck group of algebraic vector bundles on X is the free abelian group on the classes of these objects:

$$K_0(X)\cong \Z\{E_1,\ldots,E_m\}.$$

A smooth complex projective variety X with a full exceptional collection must have trivial Hodge theory, in the sense that $h^{p,q}(X)=0$ for all $p\neq q$; moreover, the cycle class map $CH^*(X)\otimes\Q\to H^*(X,\Q)$ must be an isomorphism.

== Examples ==
The original example of a full exceptional collection was discovered by Alexander Beilinson (1978): the derived category of projective space over a field has the full exceptional collection

$$\text{D}^{\text{b}}(\mathbf{P}^n)=\langle O,O(1),\ldots,O(n)\rangle$$,

where O(j) for integers j are the line bundles on projective space. Full exceptional collections have also been constructed on all smooth projective toric varieties, del Pezzo surfaces, many projective homogeneous varieties, and some other Fano varieties.

More generally, if X is a smooth projective variety of positive dimension such that the coherent sheaf cohomology groups $H^i(X,O_X)$ are zero for i > 0, then the object $O_X$ in $\text{D}^{\text{b}}(X)$ is exceptional, and so it induces a nontrivial semiorthogonal decomposition $\text{D}^{\text{b}}(X)=\langle (O_X)^{\perp},O_X\rangle$. This applies to every Fano variety over a field of characteristic zero, for example. It also applies to some other varieties, such as Enriques surfaces and some surfaces of general type.

A source of examples is Orlov's blowup formula concerning the blowup $X = \operatorname{Bl}_Z(Y)$ of a smooth projective variety $Y$ at a smooth subvariety $Z$ of codimension $k$ with exceptional locus $\iota: E \simeq \mathbb{P}_Z(N_{Z/Y})\to X$. There is a semiorthogonal decomposition $D^b(X) = \langle \Phi_{1-k}(D^b(Z)), \ldots, \Phi_{-1}(D^b(Z)), \pi^*(D^b(Y))\rangle$ where $\Phi_i:D^b(Z) \to D^b(X)$ is the functor $\Phi_i(-) = \iota_*(\mathcal{O}_E(i)\otimes p^*(-))$ where $p : X \to Y$ is the natural projection map.

While these examples encompass a large number of well-studied derived categories, many naturally occurring triangulated categories are "indecomposable". In particular, for a smooth projective variety X whose canonical bundle $K_X$ is basepoint-free, every semiorthogonal decomposition $\text{D}^{\text{b}}(X)=\langle\mathcal{A},\mathcal{B}\rangle$ is trivial in the sense that $\mathcal{A}$ or $\mathcal{B}$ must be zero. For example, this applies to every variety which is Calabi–Yau in the sense that its canonical bundle is trivial.

== See also ==
- Derived noncommutative algebraic geometry
