= Graded structure =

In mathematics, the term "graded" has a number of meanings, mostly related:

In abstract algebra, it refers to a family of concepts:

- An algebraic structure $X$ is said to be $I$-graded for an index set $I$ if it has a gradation or grading, i.e. a decomposition into a direct sum $X = \bigoplus_{i \in I} X_i$ of structures; the elements of $X_i$ are said to be "homogeneous of degree i".
  - The index set $I$ is most commonly $\N$ or $\Z$, and may be required to have extra structure depending on the type of $X$.
  - Grading by $\Z_2$ (i.e. $\Z/2\Z$) is also important; see e.g. signed set (the $\Z_2$-graded sets).
  - The trivial ($\Z$- or $\N$-) gradation has $X_0 = X, X_i = 0$ for $i \neq 0$ and a suitable trivial structure $0$.
  - An algebraic structure is said to be doubly graded if the index set is a direct product of sets; the pairs may be called "bidegrees" (e.g. see Spectral sequence).
- A $I$-graded vector space or graded linear space is thus a vector space with a decomposition into a direct sum $V = \bigoplus_{i \in I} V_i$ of spaces.
  - A graded linear map is a map between graded vector spaces respecting their gradations.
- A graded ring is a ring that is a direct sum of additive abelian groups $R_i$ such that $R_i R_j \subseteq R_{i+j}$, with $i$ taken from some monoid, usually $\N$ or $\mathbb{Z}$, or semigroup (for a ring without identity).
  - The associated graded ring of a commutative ring $R$ with respect to a proper ideal $I$ is $\operatorname{gr}_I R = \bigoplus_{n \in \N} I^n/I^{n+1}$.
- A graded module is left module $M$ over a graded ring that is a direct sum $\bigoplus_{i \in I} M_i$ of modules satisfying $R_i M_j \subseteq M_{i+j}$.
  - The associated graded module of an $R$-module $M$ with respect to a proper ideal $I$ is $\operatorname{gr}_I M = \bigoplus_{n \in \N} I^n M/ I^{n+1} M$.
  - A differential graded module, differential graded $\mathbb{Z}$-module or DG-module is a graded module $M$ with a differential $d \colon M \to M \colon M_i \to M_{i+1}$ making $M$ a chain complex, i.e. $d \circ d = 0$ .
- A graded algebra is an algebra $A$ over a ring $R$ that is graded as a ring; if $R$ is graded we also require $A_i R_j \subseteq A_{i+j} \supseteq R_iA_j$.
  - The graded Leibniz rule for a map $d\colon A \to A$ on a graded algebra $A$ specifies that $d(a \cdot b) = (da) \cdot b + (-1)^{|a|}a \cdot (db)$.
  - A differential graded algebra, DG-algebra or DGAlgebra is a graded algebra that is a differential graded module whose differential obeys the graded Leibniz rule.
  - A homogeneous derivation on a graded algebra A is a homogeneous linear map of grade d = |D| on A such that $D(ab) = D(a)b + \varepsilon^{|a||D|}aD(b), \varepsilon = \pm 1$ acting on homogeneous elements of A.
  - A graded derivation is a sum of homogeneous derivations with the same $\varepsilon$.
  - A DGA is an augmented DG-algebra, or differential graded augmented algebra, (see Differential graded algebra).
  - A superalgebra is a $\mathbb{Z}_2$-graded algebra.
    - A graded-commutative superalgebra satisfies the "supercommutative" law $yx = (-1)^{|x| |y|}xy.$ for homogeneous x,y, where $|a|$ represents the "parity" of $a$, i.e. 0 or 1 depending on the component in which it lies.
  - CDGA may refer to the category of augmented differential graded commutative algebras.
- A graded Lie algebra is a Lie algebra that is graded as a vector space by a gradation compatible with its Lie bracket.
  - A graded Lie superalgebra is a graded Lie algebra with the requirement for anticommutativity of its Lie bracket relaxed.
  - A supergraded Lie superalgebra is a graded Lie superalgebra with an additional super $\Z_2$-gradation.
  - A differential graded Lie algebra is a graded vector space over a field of characteristic zero together with a bilinear map $[\ , ]\colon L_i \otimes L_j \to L_{i+j}$ and a differential $d\colon L_i \to L_{i-1}$ satisfying $[x,y] = (-1)^{|x||y|+1}[y,x],$ for any homogeneous elements x, y in L, the "graded Jacobi identity" and the graded Leibniz rule.
- The Graded Brauer group is a synonym for the Brauer–Wall group $BW(F)$ classifying finite-dimensional graded central division algebras over the field F.
- An $\mathcal{A}$-graded category for a category $\mathcal{A}$ is a category $\mathcal{C}$ together with a functor $F\colon \mathcal{C} \rightarrow \mathcal{A}$.
  - A differential graded category or DG category is a category whose morphism sets form differential graded $\mathbb{Z}$-modules.
- Graded manifold – extension of the manifold concept based on ideas coming from supersymmetry and supercommutative algebra, including sections on
  - Graded function
  - Graded vector fields
  - Graded exterior forms
  - Graded differential geometry
  - Graded differential calculus

In other areas of mathematics:

- Functionally graded elements are used in finite element analysis.
- A graded poset is a poset $P$ with a rank function $\rho\colon P \to \N$ compatible with the ordering (i.e. $\rho(x) < \rho(y) \implies x < y$) such that $y$ covers $x \implies \rho(y) = \rho(x)+1$ .
