= Derived noncommutative algebraic geometry =

Mathematics study in geometry

In mathematics, derived noncommutative algebraic geometry, the derived version of noncommutative algebraic geometry, is the geometric study of derived categories and related constructions of triangulated categories using categorical tools. Some basic examples include the bounded derived category of coherent sheaves on a smooth variety, $D^b(X)$, called its derived category, or the derived category of perfect complexes on an algebraic variety, denoted $D_{\operatorname{perf}}(X)$. For instance, the derived category of coherent sheaves $D^b(X)$ on a smooth projective variety can be used as an invariant of the underlying variety for many cases (if $X$ has an ample (anti-)canonical sheaf). Unfortunately, studying derived categories as geometric objects of themselves does not have a standardized name.

== Derived category of projective line ==
The derived category of $\mathbb{P}^1$ is one of the motivating examples for derived non-commutative schemes due to its easy categorical structure. Recall that the Euler sequence of $\mathbb{P}^1$ is the short exact sequence

$$0 \to \mathcal{O}(-2) \to \mathcal{O}(-1)^{\oplus 2} \to \mathcal{O} \to 0$$

if we consider the two terms on the right as a complex, then we get the distinguished triangle

$$\mathcal{O}(-1)^{\oplus 2} \overset{\phi}{\rightarrow} \mathcal{O} \to \operatorname{Cone}(\phi) \overset{+1}{\rightarrow}.$$

Since $\operatorname{Cone}(\phi) \cong \mathcal{O}(-2)[+1]$ we have constructed this sheaf $\mathcal{O}(-2)$ using only categorical tools. We could repeat this again by tensoring the Euler sequence by the flat sheaf $\mathcal{O}(-1)$, and apply the cone construction again. If we take the duals of the sheaves, then we can construct all of the line bundles in $\operatorname{Coh}(\mathbb{P}^1)$ using only its triangulated structure. It turns out the correct way of studying derived categories from its objects and triangulated structure is with exceptional collections.

== Semiorthogonal decompositions and exceptional collections ==
The technical tools for encoding this construction are semiorthogonal decompositions and exceptional collections. A semiorthogonal decomposition of a triangulated category $\mathcal{T}$ is a collection of full triangulated subcategories $\mathcal{T}_1,\ldots, \mathcal{T}_n$ such that the following two properties hold

(1) For objects $T_i \in \operatorname{Ob}(\mathcal{T}_i)$ we have $\operatorname{Hom}(T_i, T_j) = 0$ for $i > j$

(2) The subcategories $\mathcal{T}_i$ generate $\mathcal{T}$, meaning every object $T \in \operatorname{Ob}(\mathcal{T})$ can be decomposed in to a sequence of $T_i \in \operatorname{Ob}(\mathcal{T})$,

$$0 = T_n \to T_{n-1} \to \cdots \to T_1 \to T_0 = T$$

such that $\operatorname{Cone}(T_i \to T_{i-1}) \in \operatorname{Ob}(\mathcal{T}_i)$. Notice this is analogous to a filtration of an object in an abelian category such that the cokernels live in a specific subcategory.

We can specialize this a little further by considering exceptional collections of objects, which generate their own subcategories. An object $E$ in a triangulated category is called exceptional if the following property holds

$$\operatorname{Hom}(E,E[+\ell]) = \begin{cases}
k &\text{if } \ell = 0 \\
0 &\text{if } \ell \neq 0
\end{cases}$$

where $k$ is the underlying field of the vector space of morphisms. A collection of exceptional objects $E_1, \ldots, E_r$ is an exceptional collection of length $r$ if for any $i > j$ and any $\ell$, we have

$$\operatorname{Hom}(E_i, E_j[+\ell]) = 0$$

and is a strong exceptional collection if in addition, for any $\ell \neq 0$ and any $i, j$, we have

$$\operatorname{Hom}(E_i, E_j[+\ell]) = 0$$

We can then decompose our triangulated category into the semiorthogonal decomposition

$$\mathcal{T} = \langle \mathcal{T}', E_1, \ldots, E_r \rangle$$

where $\mathcal{T}' = \langle E_1, \ldots, E_r \rangle^\perp$, the subcategory of objects in $E \in \operatorname{Ob}(\mathcal{T})$ such that $\operatorname{Hom}(E, E_i[+\ell]) = 0$. If in addition $\mathcal{T}' = 0$ then the strong exceptional collection is called full.

== Beilinson's theorem ==
Beilinson provided the first example of a full strong exceptional collection. In the derived category $D^b(\mathbb{P}^n)$ the line bundles $\mathcal{O}(-n), \mathcal{O}(-n+1), \ldots, \mathcal{O}(-1), \mathcal{O}$ form a full strong exceptional collection. He proves the theorem in two parts. First showing these objects are an exceptional collection and second by showing the diagonal $\mathcal{O}_\Delta$ of $\mathbb{P}^n \times \mathbb{P}^n$ has a resolution whose compositions are tensors of the pullback of the exceptional objects.

Technical Lemma

An exceptional collection of sheaves $E_1, E_2, \ldots, E_r$ on $X$ is full if there exists a resolution

$$0 \to p_1^*E_1 \otimes p_2^*F_1 \to \cdots \to p_1^*E_n \otimes p_2^*F_n \to \mathcal{O}_\Delta \to 0$$

in $D^b(X\times X)$ where $F_i$ are arbitrary coherent sheaves on $X$.

Another way to reformulate this lemma for $X = \mathbb{P}^n$ is by looking at the Koszul complex associated to

$\bigoplus_{i=0}^n \mathcal{O}(-D_i) \xrightarrow{\phi} \mathcal{O}$

where $D_i$ are hyperplane divisors of $\mathbb{P}^n$. This gives the exact complex

$0 \to \mathcal{O}\left(-\sum_{i=1}^n D_i \right) \to \cdots \to \bigoplus_{i \neq j}\mathcal{O}(-D_i - D_j) \to \bigoplus_{i=1}^n\mathcal{O}(-D_i) \to \mathcal{O} \to 0$

which gives a way to construct $\mathcal{O}(-n-1)$ using the sheaves $\mathcal{O}(-n),\ldots,\mathcal{O}(-1),\mathcal{O}$, since they are the sheaves used in all terms in the above exact sequence, except for

$$\mathcal{O}\left(-\sum_{i=0}^n D_i \right) \cong \mathcal{O}(-n-1)$$

which gives a derived equivalence of the rest of the terms of the above complex with $\mathcal{O}(-n-1)$. For $n=2$ the Koszul complex above is the exact complex

$0 \to \mathcal{O}(-3) \to \mathcal{O}(-2)\oplus\mathcal{O}(-2) \to \mathcal{O}(-1)\oplus\mathcal{O}(-1) \to \mathcal{O} \to 0$

giving the quasi isomorphism of $\mathcal{O}(-3)$ with the complex

$0 \to \mathcal{O}(-2)\oplus\mathcal{O}(-2) \to \mathcal{O}(-1)\oplus\mathcal{O}(-1) \to \mathcal{O} \to 0$

== Orlov's reconstruction theorem ==
If $X$ is a smooth projective variety with ample (anti-)canonical sheaf and there is an equivalence of derived categories $F: D^b(X) \to D^b(Y)$, then there is an isomorphism of the underlying varieties.

=== Sketch of proof ===
The proof starts out by analyzing two induced Serre functors on $D^b(Y)$ and finding an isomorphism between them. It particular, it shows there is an object $\omega_Y = F(\omega_X)$ which acts like the dualizing sheaf on $Y$. The isomorphism between these two functors gives an isomorphism of the set of underlying points of the derived categories. Then, what needs to be check is an ismorphism $F(\omega_X^{\otimes k}) \cong \omega_Y^{\otimes k}$, for any $k \in \mathbb{N}$, giving an isomorphism of canonical rings

$$A(X) = \bigoplus_{k=0}^\infty H^0(X,\omega_X^{\otimes k}) \cong \bigoplus_{k=0}^\infty H^0(Y,\omega_Y^{\otimes k})$$

If $\omega_Y$ can be shown to be (anti-)ample, then the proj of these rings will give an isomorphism $X \to Y$. All of the details are contained in Dolgachev's notes.

=== Failure of reconstruction ===
This theorem fails in the case $X$ is Calabi–Yau, since $\omega_X \cong \mathcal{O}_X$, or is the product of a variety which is Calabi–Yau. Abelian varieties are a class of examples where a reconstruction theorem could never hold. If $X$ is an abelian variety and $\hat{X}$ is its dual, the Fourier–Mukai transform with kernel $\mathcal{P}$, the Poincaré bundle, gives an equivalence

$$FM_{\mathcal{P}}:D^b(X) \to D^b(\hat{X})$$

of derived categories. Since an abelian variety is generally not isomorphic to its dual, there are derived equivalent derived categories without isomorphic underlying varieties. There is an alternative theory of tensor triangulated geometry where we consider not only a triangulated category, but also a monoidal structure, i.e. a tensor product. This geometry has a full reconstruction theorem using the spectrum of categories.

=== Equivalences on K3 surfaces ===
K3 surfaces are another class of examples where reconstruction fails due to their Calabi–Yau property. There is a criterion for determining whether or not two K3 surfaces are derived equivalent: the derived category of the K3 surface $D^b(X)$ is derived equivalent to another K3 $D^b(Y)$ if and only if there is a Hodge isometry $H^2(X, \mathbb{Z}) \to H^2(Y, \mathbb{Z})$, that is, an isomorphism of Hodge structure. Moreover, this theorem is reflected in the motivic world as well, where the Chow motives are isomorphic if and only if there is an isometry of Hodge structures.

=== Autoequivalences ===
One nice application of the proof of this theorem is the identification of autoequivalences of the derived category of a smooth projective variety with ample (anti-)canonical sheaf. This is given by

$$\operatorname{Auteq}(D^b(X)) \cong (\operatorname{Pic}(X)\rtimes \operatorname{Aut}(X))\times\mathbb{Z}$$

Where an autoequivalence $F$ is given by an automorphism $f:X\to X$, then tensored by a line bundle $\mathcal{L} \in \operatorname{Pic}(X)$ and finally composed with a shift. Note that $\operatorname{Aut}(X)$ acts on $\operatorname{Pic}(X)$ via the polarization map, $g \mapsto g^*(L)\otimes L^{-1}$.

== Relation with motives ==
The bounded derived category $D^b(X)$ was used extensively in SGA6 to construct an intersection theory with $K(X)$ and $Gr_\gamma K(X)\otimes\mathbb{Q}$. Since these objects are intimately relative with the Chow ring of $X$, its chow motive, Orlov asked the following question: given a fully faithful functor

$$F:D^b(X) \to D^b(Y)$$

is there an induced map on the chow motives

$$f:M(X) \to M(Y)$$

such that $M(X)$ is a summand of $M(Y)$? In the case of K3 surfaces, a similar result has been confirmed since derived equivalent K3 surfaces have an isometry of Hodge structures, which gives an isomorphism of motives.

== Derived category of singularities ==
On a smooth variety there is an equivalence between the derived category $D^b(X)$ and the thick full triangulated $D_{\operatorname{perf}}(X)$ of perfect complexes. For separated, Noetherian schemes of finite Krull dimension (called the ELF condition) this is not the case, and Orlov defines the derived category of singularities as their difference using a quotient of categories. For an ELF scheme $X$ its derived category of singularities is defined as

$D_{sg}(X) := D^b(X)/D_\text{perf}(X)$

for a suitable definition of localization of triangulated categories.

=== Construction of localization ===
Although localization of categories is defined for a class of morphisms $\Sigma$ in the category closed under composition, we can construct such a class from a triangulated subcategory. Given a full triangulated subcategory $\mathcal{N} \subset \mathcal{T}$ the class of morphisms $\Sigma(\mathcal{N})$, $s$ in $\mathcal{T}$ where $s$ fits into a distinguished triangle

$X \xrightarrow{s} Y \to N \to X[+1]$

with $X,Y \in \mathcal{T}$ and $N \in \mathcal{N}$. It can be checked this forms a multiplicative system using the octahedral axiom for distinguished triangles. Given

$$X \xrightarrow{s} Y \xrightarrow{s'}Z$$

with distinguished triangles

$$X \xrightarrow{s}Y \to N \to X[+1]$$

$$Y \xrightarrow{s'} Z \to N' \to Y[+1]$$

where $N,N' \in \mathcal{N}$, then there are distinguished triangles

$$X \to Z \to M \to X[+1]$$

$N \to M \to N' \to N[+1]$ where $M \in \mathcal{N}$ since $\mathcal{N}$ is closed under extensions. This new category has the following properties

- It is canonically triangulated where a triangle in $\mathcal{T}/\mathcal{N}$ is distinguished if it is isomorphic to the image of a triangle in $\mathcal{T}$
- The category $\mathcal{T}/\mathcal{N}$ has the following universal property: any exact functor $F:\mathcal{T} \to \mathcal{T}'$ where $F(N) \cong 0$ where $N \in \mathcal{N}$, then it factors uniquely through the quotient functor $Q: \mathcal{T} \to \mathcal{T}/\mathcal{N}$, so there exists a morphism $\tilde{F}: \mathcal{T}/\mathcal{N} \to \mathcal{T}'$ such that $\tilde{F}\circ Q \simeq F$.

=== Properties of singularity category ===
- If $X$ is a regular scheme, then every bounded complex of coherent sheaves is perfect. Hence the singularity category is trivial
- Any coherent sheaf $\mathcal{F}$ which has support away from $\operatorname{Sing}(X)$ is perfect. Hence nontrivial coherent sheaves in $D_{sg}(X)$ have support on $\operatorname{Sing}(X)$.
- In particular, objects in $D_{sg}(X)$ are isomorphic to $\mathcal{F}[+k]$ for some coherent sheaf $\mathcal{F}$.

=== Landau–Ginzburg models ===
Kontsevich proposed a model for Landau–Ginzburg models which was worked out to the following definition: a Landau–Ginzburg model is a smooth variety $X$ together with a morphism $W:X \to \mathbb{A}^1$ which is flat. There are three associated categories which can be used to analyze the D-branes in a Landau–Ginzburg model using matrix factorizations from commutative algebra.

==== Associated categories ====
With this definition, there are three categories which can be associated to any point $w_0 \in \mathbb{A}^1$, a $\mathbb{Z}/2$-graded category $DG_{w_0}(W)$, an exact category $\operatorname{Pair}_{w_0}(W)$, and a triangulated category $DB_{w_0}(W)$, each of which has objects

$\overline{P} = (p_1: P_1 \to P_0, p_0: P_0 \to P_1)$ where $p_0\circ p_1,p_1\circ p_0$ are multiplication by $W - w_0$.

There is also a shift functor $[+1]$ send $\overline{P}$ to

$\overline{P}[+1] = (-p_0: P_0 \to P_1, -p_1: P_1 \to P_0)$.

The difference between these categories are their definition of morphisms. The most general of which is $DG_{w_0}(W)$ whose morphisms are the $\mathbb{Z}/2$-graded complex

$$\operatorname{Hom}(\overline{P},\overline{Q}) = \bigoplus_{i,j}\operatorname{Hom}(P_i, Q_j)$$

where the grading is given by $(i-j) \bmod 2$ and differential acting on degree $d$ homogeneous elements by

$$Df = q \circ f - (-1)^df \circ p$$

In $\operatorname{Pair}_{w_0}(W)$ the morphisms are the degree $0$ morphisms in $DG_{w_0}(W)$. Finally, $DB_{w_0}(W)$ has the morphisms in $\operatorname{Pair}_{w_0}(W)$ modulo the null-homotopies. Furthermore, $DB_{w_0}(W)$ can be endowed with a triangulated structure through a graded cone-construction in $\operatorname{Pair}_{w_0}(W)$. Given $\overline{f}:\overline{P}\to\overline{Q}$ there is a mapping code $C(f)$ with maps

$c_1: Q_1\oplus P_0 \to Q_0\oplus P_1$ where
$$c_1 = \begin{bmatrix} q_0 & f_1 \\  0 &-p_1\end{bmatrix}$$

and

$c_0: Q_0\oplus P_1 \to Q_1\oplus P_0$ where
$${\displaystyle c_{0}={\begin{bmatrix}q_{1}&f_{0}\\0&-p_{0}\end{bmatrix}}}$$

Then, a diagram $\overline{P} \to \overline{Q} \to \overline{R} \to \overline{P}[+1]$ in $DB_{w_0}(W)$ is a distinguished triangle if it is isomorphic to a cone from $\operatorname{Pair}_{w_0}(W)$.

==== D-brane category ====
Using the construction of $DB_{w_0}(W)$ we can define the category of D-branes of type B on $X$ with superpotential $W$ as the product category

$$DB(W) = \prod_{w \in \mathbb{A}_1}DB_{w_0}(W).$$

This is related to the singularity category as follows: Given a superpotential $W$ with isolated singularities only at $0$, denote $X_0 = W^{-1}(0)$. Then, there is an exact equivalence of categories

$$DB_{w_0}(W) \cong D_{sg}(X_0)$$

given by a functor induced from cokernel functor $\operatorname{Cok}$ sending a pair $\overline{P} \mapsto \operatorname{Coker}(p_1)$. In particular, since $X$ is regular, Bertini's theorem shows $DB(W)$ is only a finite product of categories.

=== Computational tools ===
==== Knörrer periodicity ====
There is a Fourier-Mukai transform $\Phi_Z$ on the derived categories of two related varieties giving an equivalence of their singularity categories. This equivalence is called Knörrer periodicity. This can be constructed as follows: given a flat morphism $f:X\to\mathbb{A}^1$ from a separated regular Noetherian scheme of finite Krull dimension, there is an associated scheme $Y = X\times \mathbb{A}^2$ and morphism $g:Y \to \mathbb{A}^1$ such that $g = f + xy$ where $xy$ are the coordinates of the $\mathbb{A}^2$-factor. Consider the fibers $X_0 = f^{-1}(0)$, $Y_0 = g^{-1}(0)$, and the induced morphism $x: Y_0 \to \mathbb{A}^1$. And the fiber $Z = x^{-1}(0)$. Then, there is an injection $i:Z \to Y_0$ and a projection $q: Z \to X_0$ forming an $\mathbb{A}^1$-bundle. The Fourier-Mukai transform

$$\Phi_Z(\cdot) = \mathbf{R}i_*q^*(\cdot)$$

induces an equivalence of categories

$$D_{sg}(X_0) \to D_{sg}(Y_0)$$

called Knörrer periodicity. There is another form of this periodicity where $xy$ is replaced by the polynomial $x^2 + y^2$. These periodicity theorems are the main computational techniques because it allows for a reduction in the analysis of the singularity categories.

=== Computations ===
If we take the Landau–Ginzburg model $(\mathbb{C}^{2k+1}, W)$ where $W = z_0^n + z_1^2 + \cdots + z_{2k}^2$, then the only fiber singular fiber of $W$ is the origin. Then, the D-brane category of the Landau–Ginzburg model is equivalent to the singularity category $D_\text{sing}(\operatorname{Spec}(\mathbb{C}[z]/(z^n)))$. Over the algebra $A = \mathbb{C}[z]/(z^n)$ there are indecomposable objects

$$V_i = \operatorname{Coker}(A \xrightarrow{z^i} A) = A / z^i$$

whose morphisms can be completely understood. For any pair $i,j$ there are morphisms $\alpha_j^i: V_i \to V_j$ where

- for $i \geq j$ these are the natural projections
- for $i < j$ these are multiplication by $z^{j-i}$

where every other morphism is a composition and linear combination of these morphisms. There are many other cases which can be explicitly computed, using the table of singularities found in Knörrer's original paper.

== See also ==
- Semiorthogonal decomposition
- Fourier–Mukai transform
- Bridgeland stability condition
- Homological mirror symmetry
