= Karoubi envelope =

Category theory

In mathematics the Karoubi envelope (or Cauchy completion or idempotent completion) of a category C is a classification of the idempotents of C, by means of an auxiliary category. Taking the Karoubi envelope of a preadditive category gives a pseudo-abelian category, hence for additive categories, the construction is sometimes called the pseudo-abelian completion. It is named for the French mathematician Max Karoubi.

Given a category C, an idempotent of C is an endomorphism

$$e: A \rightarrow A$$

with

$$e\circ e = e$$.

An idempotent e: A → A is said to split if there is an object B and morphisms f: A → B, g: B → A such that e = g f and 1_{B} = f g.

The Karoubi envelope of C, sometimes written Split(C), is the category whose objects are pairs of the form (A, e) where A is an object of C and $e : A \rightarrow A$ is an idempotent of C, and whose morphisms are the triples

$$(e, f, e^{\prime}): (A, e) \rightarrow (A^{\prime}, e^{\prime})$$

where $f: A \rightarrow A^{\prime}$ is a morphism of C satisfying $e^{\prime} \circ f = f = f \circ e$ (or equivalently $f=e'\circ f\circ e$).

Composition in Split(C) is as in C, but the identity morphism on $(A,e)$ in Split(C) is $(e,e,e)$, rather than the identity on $A$.

The category C embeds fully and faithfully in Split(C). In Split(C) every idempotent splits, and Split(C) is the universal category with this property. The Karoubi envelope of a category C can therefore be considered as the "completion" of C which splits idempotents.

The Karoubi envelope of a category C can equivalently be defined as the full subcategory of $\hat{\mathbf{C}}$ (the presheaves over C) of retracts of representable functors. The category of presheaves on C is equivalent to the category of presheaves on Split(C).

== Automorphisms in the Karoubi envelope ==
An automorphism in Split(C) is of the form $(e, f, e): (A, e) \rightarrow (A, e)$, with inverse $(e, g, e): (A, e) \rightarrow (A, e)$ satisfying:

$$g \circ f = e = f \circ g$$
$$g \circ f \circ g = g$$
$$f \circ g \circ f = f$$

If the first equation is relaxed to just have $g \circ f = f \circ g$, then f is a partial automorphism (with inverse g). A (partial) involution in Split(C) is a self-inverse (partial) automorphism.

== Examples ==
- If C has products, then given an isomorphism $f: A \rightarrow B$ the mapping $f \times f^{-1}: A \times B \rightarrow B \times A$, composed with the canonical map $\gamma:B \times A \rightarrow A \times B$ of symmetry, is a partial involution.
- If C is a triangulated category, the Karoubi envelope Split(C) can be endowed with the structure of a triangulated category such that the canonical functor C → Split(C) becomes a triangulated functor.
- The Karoubi envelope is used in the construction of several categories of motives.
- The Karoubi envelope construction takes semi-adjunctions to adjunctions. For this reason the Karoubi envelope is used in the study of models of the untyped lambda calculus. The Karoubi envelope of an extensional lambda model (a monoid, considered as a category) is cartesian closed.
- The category of projective modules over any ring is the Karoubi envelope of its full subcategory of free modules.
- The category of vector bundles over any paracompact space is the Karoubi envelope of its full subcategory of trivial bundles. This is in fact a special case of the previous example by the Serre–Swan theorem and conversely this theorem can be proved by first proving both these facts, the observation that the global sections functor is an equivalence between trivial vector bundles over $X$ and free modules over $C(X)$ and then using the universal property of the Karoubi envelope.
