= Mapping cone =

Mapping cone may refer to one of the following two different but related concepts in mathematics:

- Mapping cone (topology)
- Mapping cone (homological algebra)
