= Quasi-equivalence =

Quasi-equivalence could refer to

1. Weak equivalence (homotopy theory)
2. Quasi-isometry
3. Quasi-isomorphism
4. The Caspar-Klug theory of viral capsids.
