= Triangulated category =

Category in mathematics

In mathematics, a triangulated category is a category with the additional structure of a "translation functor" and a class of "exact triangles". Prominent examples are the derived category of an abelian category, as well as the stable homotopy category. The exact triangles generalize the short exact sequences in an abelian category, as well as fiber sequences and cofiber sequences in topology.

Much of homological algebra is clarified and extended by the language of triangulated categories, an important example being the theory of sheaf cohomology. In the 1960s, a typical use of triangulated categories was to extend properties of sheaves on a space X to complexes of sheaves, viewed as objects of the derived category of sheaves on X. More recently, triangulated categories have become objects of interest in their own right. Many equivalences between triangulated categories of different origins have been proved or conjectured. For example, the homological mirror symmetry conjecture predicts that the derived category of a Calabi–Yau manifold is equivalent to the Fukaya category of its "mirror" symplectic manifold. Shift operator is a decategorified analogue of triangulated category.

== History ==
Triangulated categories were introduced independently by Dieter Puppe (1962) and Jean-Louis Verdier (1963), although Puppe's axioms were less complete (lacking the octahedral axiom (TR 4)). Puppe was motivated by the stable homotopy category. Verdier's key example was the derived category of an abelian category, which he also defined, developing ideas of Alexander Grothendieck. The early applications of derived categories included coherent duality and Verdier duality, which extends Poincaré duality to singular spaces.

== Definition ==
A shift or translation functor on a category D is an additive automorphism (or for some authors, an auto-equivalence) $\Sigma$ from D to D. It is common to write $X[n] =\Sigma^n X$ for integers n.

A triangle (X, Y, Z, u, v, w) consists of three objects X, Y, and Z, together with morphisms $u\colon X\to Y$, $v\colon Y \to Z$ and $w\colon Z\to X[1]$. Triangles are generally written in the unravelled form:

$$X \xrightarrow{{} \atop u} Y \xrightarrow{{} \atop v} Z \xrightarrow {{} \atop w} X[1],$$

or

$$X \xrightarrow{{} \atop u} Y \xrightarrow{{} \atop v} Z \xrightarrow {{} \atop w}$$

for short.

A triangulated category is an additive category D with a translation functor and a class of triangles, called exact triangles (or distinguished triangles), satisfying the following properties (TR 1), (TR 2), (TR 3) and (TR 4). (These axioms are not entirely independent, since (TR 3) can be derived from the others.)

=== TR 1 ===
- For every object X, the following triangle is exact:

$$X \overset{\text{id}}{\to} X \to 0 \to X[1]$$

- For every morphism $u\colon X\to Y$, there is an object Z (called a cone or cofiber of the morphism u) fitting into an exact triangle

$$X \xrightarrow{{} \atop u} Y \to Z \to X[1]$$

The name "cone" comes from the cone of a map of chain complexes, which in turn was inspired by the mapping cone in topology. It follows from the other axioms that an exact triangle (and in particular the object Z) is determined up to isomorphism by the morphism $X\to Y$, although not always up to a unique isomorphism.

- Every triangle isomorphic to an exact triangle is exact. This means that if

$$X \xrightarrow{{} \atop u} Y \xrightarrow{{} \atop v} Z \xrightarrow{{} \atop w} X[1]$$

is an exact triangle, and $f\colon X\to X'$, $g\colon Y\to Y'$, and $h\colon Z\to Z'$ are isomorphisms, then

$$X' \xrightarrow{guf^{-1}} Y'\xrightarrow{hvg^{-1}} Z' \xrightarrow {f[1]wh^{-1}} X'[1]$$

is also an exact triangle.

=== TR 2 ===
If

$$X \xrightarrow{{} \atop u} Y \xrightarrow{{} \atop v} Z \xrightarrow {{} \atop w} X[1]$$

is an exact triangle, then so are the two rotated triangles

$$Y \xrightarrow{{} \atop v} Z \xrightarrow{{} \atop w} X[1] \xrightarrow{-u[1]} Y[1]$$

and

$$Z[-1] \xrightarrow{-w[-1]} X \xrightarrow{{} \atop u} Y \xrightarrow{{} \atop v} Z.\$$

In view of the last triangle, the object Z[−1] is called a fiber of the morphism $X\to Y$.

The second rotated triangle has a more complex form when $[1]$ and $[-1]$ are not isomorphisms but only mutually inverse equivalences of categories, since $-w[-1]$ is a morphism from $Z[-1]$ to $(X[1])[-1]$, and to obtain a morphism to $[X]$ one must compose with the natural transformation $(X[1])[-1] \xrightarrow{} X$. This leads to complex questions about possible axioms one has to impose on the natural transformations making $[1]$ and $[-1]$ into a pair of inverse equivalences. Due to this issue, the assumption that $[1]$ and $[-1]$ are mutually inverse isomorphisms is the usual choice in the definition of a triangulated category.

=== TR 3 ===
Given two exact triangles and a map between the first morphisms in each triangle, there exists a morphism between the third objects in each of the two triangles that makes everything commute. That is, in the following diagram (where the two rows are exact triangles and f and g are morphisms such that gu = u′f), there exists a map h (not necessarily unique) making all the squares commute:

=== TR 4: The octahedral axiom ===
Let $u\colon X\to Y$ and $v\colon Y\to Z$ be morphisms, and consider the composed morphism $vu\colon X\to Z$. Form exact triangles for each of these three morphisms according to TR 1. The octahedral axiom states (roughly) that the three mapping cones can be made into the vertices of an exact triangle so that "everything commutes."

More formally, given exact triangles

$$X \xrightarrow{u\,} Y \xrightarrow{j} Z' \xrightarrow {k} X[1]$$
$$Y \xrightarrow{v\,} Z \xrightarrow{l} X' \xrightarrow {i} Y[1]$$
$$X \xrightarrow{{} \atop vu} Z \xrightarrow{m} Y' \xrightarrow {n} X[1]$$,

there exists an exact triangle

$$Z' \xrightarrow{f} Y' \xrightarrow{g} X' \xrightarrow {h} Z'[1]$$

such that

$$l=gm,\quad k=nf,\quad h=j[1]i,\quad ig=u[1]n,\quad fj=mv.$$

This axiom is called the "octahedral axiom" because drawing all the objects and morphisms gives the skeleton of an octahedron, four of whose faces are exact triangles. The presentation here is Verdier's own, and appears, complete with octahedral diagram, in (Hartshorne 1966). In the following diagram, u and v are the given morphisms, and the primed letters are the cones of various maps (chosen so that every exact triangle has an X, a Y, and a Z letter). Various arrows have been marked with [1] to indicate that they are of "degree 1"; e.g. the map from Z′ to X is in fact from Z′ to X[1]. The octahedral axiom then asserts the existence of maps f and g forming an exact triangle, and so that f and g form commutative triangles in the other faces that contain them:

Two different pictures appear in (Beilinson, Bernstein & Deligne 1982) (Gelfand and Manin (2006) also present the first one). The first presents the upper and lower pyramids of the above octahedron and asserts that given a lower pyramid, one can fill in an upper pyramid so that the two paths from Y to Y′, and from Y′ to Y, are equal (this condition is omitted, perhaps erroneously, from Hartshorne's presentation). The triangles marked + are commutative and those marked "d" are exact:

The second diagram is a more innovative presentation. Exact triangles are presented linearly, and the diagram emphasizes the fact that the four triangles in the "octahedron" are connected by a series of maps of triangles, where three triangles (namely, those completing the morphisms from X to Y, from Y to Z, and from X to Z) are given and the existence of the fourth is claimed. One passes between the first two by "pivoting" about X, to the third by pivoting about Z, and to the fourth by pivoting about X′. All enclosures in this diagram are commutative (both trigons and the square) but the other commutative square, expressing the equality of the two paths from Y′ to Y, is not evident. All the arrows pointing "off the edge" are degree 1:

This last diagram also illustrates a useful intuitive interpretation of the octahedral axiom. In triangulated categories, triangles play the role of exact sequences, and so it is suggestive to think of these objects as "quotients", $Z' = Y/X$ and $Y' = Z/X$. In those terms, the existence of the last triangle expresses on the one hand

$X' = Z/Y\$ (looking at the triangle $Y \to Z \to X' \to$ ), and
$X' = Y'/Z'$ (looking at the triangle $Z' \to Y' \to X' \to$ ).

Putting these together, the octahedral axiom asserts the "third isomorphism theorem":

$$(Z/X)/(Y/X)\cong Z/Y.$$

If the triangulated category is the derived category D(A) of an abelian category A, and X, Y, Z are objects of A viewed as complexes concentrated in degree 0, and the maps $X\to Y$ and $Y\to Z$ are monomorphisms in A, then the cones of these morphisms in D(A) are actually isomorphic to the quotients above in A.

Finally, Neeman (2001) formulates the octahedral axiom using a two-dimensional commutative diagram with 4 rows and 4 columns. Beilinson, Bernstein, and Deligne (1982) also give generalizations of the octahedral axiom.

== Properties ==
Here are some simple consequences of the axioms for a triangulated category D.

- Given an exact triangle

$$X \xrightarrow{{} \atop u} Y \xrightarrow{{} \atop v} Z \xrightarrow {{} \atop w} X[1]$$

in D, the composition of any two successive morphisms is zero. That is, vu = 0, wv = 0, u[1]w = 0, and so on.

- Given a morphism $u\colon X\to Y$, TR 1 guarantees the existence of a cone Z completing an exact triangle. Any two cones of u are isomorphic, but the isomorphism is not always uniquely determined.
- Every monomorphism in D is the inclusion of a direct summand, $X\to X\oplus Y$, and every epimorphism is a projection $X\oplus Y\to X$. A related point is that one should not talk about "injectivity" or "surjectivity" for morphisms in a triangulated category. Every morphism $X\to Y$ that is not an isomorphism has a nonzero "cokernel" Z (meaning that there is an exact triangle $X\to Y\to Z\to X[1]$) and also a nonzero "kernel", namely Z[−1].

=== Non-functoriality of the cone construction ===
One of the technical complications with triangulated categories is the fact the cone construction is not functorial. For example, given a ring $R$ and the partial map of distinguished triangles

$$\begin{matrix}
R &\to& 0 & \to & R[+1] & \to \\
\downarrow & & \downarrow & &  &  \\
0 & \to & R[+1] &\to & R[+1] & \to
\end{matrix}$$

in $D^b(R)$, there are two maps which complete this diagram. This could be the identity map, or the zero map

$$\begin{align}
\text{id}:&R[+1] \to R[+1] \\
0:&R[+1] \to R[+1]
\end{align}$$

both of which are commutative. The fact there exist two maps is a shadow of the fact that a triangulated category is a tool which encodes homotopy limits and colimit. One solution for this problem was proposed by Grothendieck where not only the derived category is considered, but the derived category of diagrams on this category. Such an object is called a Derivator.

== Examples ==
1. Vector spaces over a field k form an elementary triangulated category in which X[1] = X for all X. An exact triangle is a sequence $X \to Y \to Z \to X \to Y$ of k-linear maps (writing the same map $X\to Y$ twice) which is exact at X, Y and Z.
2. If A is an additive category (for example, an abelian category), define the homotopy category $K(A)$ to have as objects the chain complexes in A, and as morphisms the homotopy classes of morphisms of complexes. Then $K(A)$ is a triangulated category. The shift X[1] is the complex X moved one step to the left (and with differentials multiplied by −1). An exact triangle in $K(A)$ is a triangle which is isomorphic in $K(A)$ to the triangle $X\to Y\to\text{cone}(f)\to X[1]$ associated to some map $f\colon X\to Y$ of chain complexes. (Here $\text{cone}(f)$ denotes the mapping cone of a chain map.)
3. The derived category D(A) of an abelian category A is a triangulated category. It is constructed from the category of complexes C(A) by localizing with respect to all quasi-isomorphisms. That is, formally adjoin an inverse morphism for every quasi-isomorphism. The objects of D(A) are unchanged; that is, they are chain complexes. An exact triangle in D(A) is a triangle which is isomorphic in D(A) to the triangle $X\to Y\to\text{cone}(f)\to X[1]$ associated to some map $f\colon X\to Y$ of chain complexes.
  A key motivation for the derived category is that derived functors on A can be viewed as functors on the derived category. Some natural subcategories of D(A) are also triangulated categories, for example the subcategory of complexes X whose cohomology objects $H^i(X)$ in A vanish for i sufficiently negative, sufficiently positive, or both, called $D^+(A),D^-(A),D^{\text{b}}(A)$, respectively.
4. In topology, the stable homotopy category $h\cal{S}$ is a triangulated category. The objects are spectra, the shift X[1] is the suspension $\Sigma X$ (or equivalently the delooping $\Omega^{-1}X$), and the exact triangles are the cofiber sequences. A distinctive feature of the stable homotopy category (compared to the unstable homotopy category) is that fiber sequences are the same as cofiber sequences. In fact, in any triangulated category, exact triangles can be viewed as fiber sequences and also as cofiber sequences.
5. In modular representation theory of a finite group G, the stable module category StMod(kG) is a triangulated category. Its objects are the representations of G over a field k, and the morphisms are the usual ones modulo those that factor via projective (or equivalently injective) kG-modules. More generally, the stable module category is defined for any Frobenius algebra in place of kG.

== Are there better axioms? ==
Some experts suspect^{pg 190} (see, for example, (Gelfand & Manin 2006, Introduction, Chapter IV)) that triangulated categories are not really the "correct" concept. The essential reason is that the cone of a morphism is unique only up to a non-unique isomorphism. In particular, the cone of a morphism does not in general depend functorially on the morphism (note the non-uniqueness in axiom (TR 3), for example). This non-uniqueness is a potential source of errors. The axioms work adequately in practice, however, and there is a great deal of literature devoted to their study.

=== Derivators ===
One alternative proposal is the theory of derivators proposed in Pursuing stacks by Grothendieck in the 80s^{pg 191}, and later developed in the 90s in his manuscript on the topic. Essentially, these are a system of homotopy categories given by the diagram categories $I \to M$ for a category with a class of weak equivalences $(M, W)$. These categories are then related by the morphisms of diagrams $I \to J$. This formalism has the advantage of being able to recover the homotopy limits and colimits, which replaces the cone construction.

=== Stable ∞-categories ===
Another alternative built is the theory of stable ∞-categories. The homotopy category of a stable ∞-category is canonically triangulated, and moreover mapping cones become essentially unique (in a precise homotopical sense). Moreover, a stable ∞-category naturally encodes a whole hierarchy of compatibilities for its homotopy category, at the bottom of which sits the octahedral axiom. Thus, it is strictly stronger to give the data of a stable ∞-category than to give the data of a triangulation of its homotopy category. Nearly all triangulated categories that arise in practice come from stable ∞-categories. A similar (but more special) enrichment of triangulated categories is the notion of a dg-category.

In some ways, stable ∞-categories or dg-categories work better than triangulated categories. One example is the notion of an exact functor between triangulated categories, discussed below. For a smooth projective variety X over a field k, the bounded derived category of coherent sheaves $\text{D}^{\text{b}}(X)$ comes from a dg-category in a natural way. For varieties X and Y, every functor from the dg-category of X to that of Y comes from a complex of sheaves on $X\times Y$ by the Fourier–Mukai transform. By contrast, there is an example of an exact functor from $\text{D}^{\text{b}}(X)$ to $\text{D}^{\text{b}}(Y)$ that does not come from a complex of sheaves on $X\times Y$. In view of this example, the "right" notion of a morphism between triangulated categories seems to be one that comes from a morphism of underlying dg-categories (or stable ∞-categories).

Another advantage of stable ∞-categories or dg-categories over triangulated categories appears in algebraic K-theory. One can define the algebraic K-theory of a stable ∞-category or dg-category C, giving a sequence of abelian groups $K_i(C)$ for integers i. The group $K_0(C)$ has a simple description in terms of the triangulated category associated to C. But an example shows that the higher K-groups of a dg-category are not always determined by the associated triangulated category. Thus a triangulated category has a well-defined $K_0$ group, but in general not higher K-groups.

On the other hand, the theory of triangulated categories is simpler than the theory of stable ∞-categories or dg-categories, and in many applications the triangulated structure is sufficient. An example is the proof of the Bloch–Kato conjecture, where many computations were done at the level of triangulated categories, and the additional structure of ∞-categories or dg-categories was not required.

== Cohomology in triangulated categories ==
Triangulated categories admit a notion of cohomology, and every triangulated category has a large supply of cohomological functors. A cohomological functor F from a triangulated category D to an abelian category A is a functor such that for every exact triangle

$$X \to Y \to Z \to X[1],\$$

the sequence $F(X)\to F(Y)\to F(Z)$ in A is exact. Since an exact triangle determines an infinite sequence of exact triangles in both directions,

$$\cdots\to Z[-1]\to X\to Y \to Z \to X[1] \to\cdots,\$$

a cohomological functor F actually gives a long exact sequence in the abelian category A:

$$\cdots\to F(Z[-1])\to F(X)\to F(Y)\to F(Z)\to F(X[1])\to\cdots.\$$

A key example is: for each object B in a triangulated category D, the functors $\operatorname{Hom}(B, \text{-})$ and $\operatorname{Hom}(\text{-}, B)$ are cohomological, with values in the category of abelian groups. (To be precise, the latter is a contravariant functor, which can be considered as a functor on the opposite category of D.) That is, an exact triangle $X\to Y\to Z\to X[1]$ determines two long exact sequences of abelian groups:

$$\cdots \to \operatorname{Hom}(B,X[i])\to \operatorname{Hom}(B,Y[i])\to \operatorname{Hom}(B,Z[i])\to \operatorname{Hom}(B,X[i+1])\to\cdots$$

and

$$\cdots\to\operatorname{Hom}(Z,B[i])\to\operatorname{Hom}(Y,B[i])\to\operatorname{Hom}(X,B[i])\to\operatorname{Hom}(Z,B[i+1])\to\cdots.$$

For particular triangulated categories, these exact sequences yield many of the important exact sequences in sheaf cohomology, group cohomology, and other areas of mathematics.

One may also use the notation

$$\operatorname{Ext}^i(B,X)=\operatorname{Hom}(B,X[i])$$

for integers i, generalizing the Ext functor in an abelian category. In this notation, the first exact sequence above would be written:

$$\cdots \to \operatorname{Ext}^i(B,X) \to \operatorname{Ext}^i(B,Y) \to \operatorname{Ext}^i(B,Z) \to \operatorname{Ext}^{i+1}(B,X)\to\cdots.\$$

For an abelian category A, another basic example of a cohomological functor on the derived category D(A) sends a complex X to the object $H^0(X)$ in A. That is, an exact triangle $X\to Y\to Z\to X[1]$ in D(A) determines a long exact sequence in A:

$$\cdots\to H^i(X)\to H^i(Y)\to H^i(Z)\to H^{i+1}(X)\to\cdots,$$

using that $H^0(X[i])\cong H^i(X)$.

== Exact functors and equivalences ==
An exact functor (also called triangulated functor) from a triangulated category D to a triangulated category E is an additive functor $F\colon D\to E$ which, loosely speaking, commutes with translation and sends exact triangles to exact triangles.

In more detail, an exact functor comes with a natural isomorphism $\eta\colon F\Sigma\to \Sigma F$ (where the first $\Sigma$ denotes the translation functor of D and the second $\Sigma$ denotes the translation functor of E), such that whenever

$$X \xrightarrow{{} \atop u} Y \xrightarrow{{} \atop v} Z \xrightarrow {{} \atop w} X[1]$$

is an exact triangle in D,

$$F(X) \xrightarrow{F(u)} F(Y) \xrightarrow{F(v)} F(Z) \xrightarrow {\eta_X F(w)} F(X)[1]$$

is an exact triangle in E.

An equivalence of triangulated categories is an exact functor $F\colon D\to E$ that is also an equivalence of categories. In this case, there is an exact functor $G\colon E\to D$ such that FG and GF are naturally isomorphic to the respective identity functors.

== Compactly generated triangulated categories ==
Let D be a triangulated category such that direct sums indexed by an arbitrary set (not necessarily finite) exist in D. An object X in D is called compact if the functor $\text{Hom}_D(X,\text{-})$ commutes with direct sums. Explicitly, this means that for every family of objects $Y_i$ in D indexed by a set S, the natural homomorphism of abelian groups $\oplus_{i\in S}\mathrm{Hom}_D(X,Y_i)\to\mathrm{Hom}_D(X,\oplus_{i\in S}Y_i)$ is an isomorphism. This is different from the general notion of a compact object in category theory, which involves all colimits rather than only coproducts.

For example, a compact object in the stable homotopy category $h\cal{S}$ is a finite spectrum. A compact object in the derived category of a ring, or in the quasi-coherent derived category of a scheme, is a perfect complex. In the case of a smooth projective variety X over a field, the category Perf(X) of perfect complexes can also be viewed as the bounded derived category of coherent sheaves, $D^{\text{b}}_{\text{coh}}(X)$.

A triangulated category D is compactly generated if

- D has arbitrary (not necessarily finite) direct sums;
- There is a set S of compact objects in D such that for every nonzero object X in D, there is an object Y in S with a nonzero map $Y[n]\to X$ for some integer n.

Many naturally occurring "large" triangulated categories are compactly generated:

- The derived category of modules over a ring R is compactly generated by one object, the R-module R.
- The quasi-coherent derived category of a quasi-compact quasi-separated scheme is compactly generated by one object.
- The stable homotopy category is compactly generated by one object, the sphere spectrum $S^0$.

Amnon Neeman generalized the Brown representability theorem to any compactly generated triangulated category, as follows. Let D be a compactly generated triangulated category, $H\colon D^{\text{op}}\to\text{Ab}$ a cohomological functor which takes coproducts to products. Then H is representable. (That is, there is an object W of D such that $H(X)\cong\text{Hom}(X,W)$ for all X.) For another version, let D be a compactly generated triangulated category, T any triangulated category. If an exact functor $F\colon D\to T$ sends coproducts to coproducts, then F has a right adjoint.

The Brown representability theorem can be used to define various functors between triangulated categories. In particular, Neeman used it to simplify and generalize the construction of the exceptional inverse image functor $f^!$ for a morphism f of schemes, the central feature of coherent duality theory.

== t-structures ==
For every abelian category A, the derived category D(A) is a triangulated category, containing A as a full subcategory (the complexes concentrated in degree zero). Different abelian categories can have equivalent derived categories, so that it is not always possible to reconstruct A from D(A) as a triangulated category.

Alexander Beilinson, Joseph Bernstein and Pierre Deligne described this situation by the notion of a t-structure on a triangulated category D. A t-structure on D determines an abelian category inside D, and different t-structures on D may yield different abelian categories.

== Localizing and thick subcategories ==
Let D be a triangulated category with arbitrary direct sums. A localizing subcategory of D is a strictly full triangulated subcategory that is closed under arbitrary direct sums. To explain the name: if a localizing subcategory S of a compactly generated triangulated category D is generated by a set of objects, then there is a Bousfield localization functor $L\colon D\to D$ with kernel S. (That is, for every object X in D there is an exact triangle $Y\to X\to LX\to Y[1]$ with Y in S and LX in the right orthogonal $S^{\perp}$.) For example, this construction includes the localization of a spectrum at a prime number, or the restriction from a complex of sheaves on a space to an open subset.

A parallel notion is more relevant for "small" triangulated categories: a thick subcategory of a triangulated category C is a strictly full triangulated subcategory that is closed under direct summands. (If C is idempotent-complete, a subcategory is thick if and only if it is also idempotent-complete.) A localizing subcategory is thick. So if S is a localizing subcategory of a triangulated category D, then the intersection of S with the subcategory $D^{\text{c}}$ of compact objects is a thick subcategory of $D^{\text{c}}$.

For example, Devinatz–Hopkins–Smith described all thick subcategories of the triangulated category of finite spectra in terms of Morava K-theory. The localizing subcategories of the whole stable homotopy category have not been classified.

== See also ==
- Fourier–Mukai transform
- Six operations
- Perverse sheaf
- D-module
- Beilinson–Bernstein localization
- Module spectrum
- Semiorthogonal decomposition
- Bridgeland stability condition
