= Ideal reduction =

Concept in commutative algebra

The reduction theory goes back to the influential 1954 paper by Northcott and Rees, the paper that introduced the basic notions. In algebraic geometry, the theory is among the essential tools to extract detailed information about the behaviors of blow-ups.

Given ideals J ⊂ I in a ring R, the ideal J is said to be a reduction of I if there is some integer m > 0 such that $J I^m = I^{m+1}$. For such ideals, immediately from the definition, the following hold:

- For any k, $J^k I^m = J^{k-1}I^{m+1} = \cdots = I^{m+k}$.
- J and I have the same radical and the same set of minimal prime ideals over them (the converse is false).

If R is a Noetherian ring, then J is a reduction of I if and only if the Rees algebra R[It] is finite over R[Jt]. (This is the reason for the relation to a blow up.)

A closely related notion is that of analytic spread. By definition, the fiber cone ring of a Noetherian local ring (R, $\mathfrak{m}$) along an ideal I is

$$\mathcal{F}_I(R) = R[It] \otimes_R \kappa(\mathfrak{m}) \simeq \bigoplus_{n=0}^{\infty} I^n/\mathfrak{m} I^n$$.

The Krull dimension of $\mathcal{F}_I(R)$ is called the analytic spread of I. Given a reduction $J \subset I$, the minimum number of generators of J is at least the analytic spread of I. Also, a partial converse holds for infinite fields: if $R/\mathfrak m$ is infinite and if the integer $\ell$ is the analytic spread of I, then each reduction of I contains a reduction generated by $\ell$ elements.
