= Graded ring =

Type of algebraic structure

In mathematics, in particular abstract algebra, a graded ring is a ring such that the underlying additive group is a direct sum of abelian groups $R_i$ such that $R_i R_j \subseteq R_{i+j}$. The index set is usually the set of nonnegative integers or the set of integers, but can be any monoid. The direct sum decomposition is usually referred to as gradation or grading.

A graded module is defined similarly (see below for the precise definition). It generalizes graded vector spaces. A graded module that is also a graded ring is called a graded algebra. A graded ring could also be viewed as a graded $\Z$-algebra.

The associativity is not important (in fact not used at all) in the definition of a graded ring; hence, the notion applies to non-associative algebras as well; e.g., one can consider a graded Lie algebra.

== First properties ==
Generally, the index set of a graded ring is assumed to be the set of nonnegative integers, unless otherwise explicitly specified. This is the case in this article.

A graded ring is a ring that is decomposed into a direct sum

$$R = \bigoplus_{n=0}^\infty R_n = R_0 \oplus R_1 \oplus R_2 \oplus \cdots$$

of additive groups, such that

$$R_mR_n \subseteq R_{m+n}$$

for all nonnegative integers $m$ and $n$.

A nonzero element of $R_n$ is said to be homogeneous of degree $n$. By definition of a direct sum, every nonzero element $a$ of $R$ can be uniquely written as a sum $a=a_0+a_1+\cdots +a_n$ where each $a_i$ is either 0 or homogeneous of degree $i$. The nonzero $a_i$ are the homogeneous components of $a$.

Some basic properties are:

- $R_0$ is a subring of $R$; in particular, the multiplicative identity $1$ is a homogeneous element of degree zero.
- For any $n$, $R_n$ is a two-sided $R_0$-module, and the direct sum decomposition is a direct sum of $R_0$-modules.
- $R$ is an associative $R_0$-algebra.

=== Ideals ===
An ideal $I\subseteq R$ is homogeneous, if for every $a \in I$, the homogeneous components of $a$ also belong to $I$. (Equivalently, if it is a graded submodule of $R$; see § Graded module.) The intersection of a homogeneous ideal $I$ with $R_n$ is an $R_0$-submodule of $R_n$ called the homogeneous part of degree $n$ of $I$. A homogeneous ideal is the direct sum of its homogeneous parts.

=== Quotients ===
If $I$ is a two-sided homogeneous ideal in $R$, then $R/I$ is also a graded ring, decomposed as

$$R/I = \bigoplus_{n=0}^\infty R_n/I_n,$$

where $I_n$ is the homogeneous part of degree $n$ of $I$.

== Basic examples ==
- Any (non-graded) ring R can be given a gradation by letting $R_0=R$, and $R_i=0$ for i ≠ 0. This is called the trivial gradation on R.
- The polynomial ring $R = k[t_1, \ldots, t_n]$ is graded by degree: it is a direct sum of $R_i$ consisting of homogeneous polynomials of degree i.
- Let S be the set of all nonzero homogeneous elements in a graded integral domain R. Then the localization of R with respect to S is a $\Z$-graded ring.
- If I is an ideal in a commutative ring R, then $\bigoplus_{n=0}^{\infty} I^n/I^{n+1}$ is a graded ring called the associated graded ring of R along I; geometrically, it is the coordinate ring of the normal cone along the subvariety defined by I.
- Let X be a topological space, H^{i}(X; R) the ith cohomology group with coefficients in a ring R. Then H^{*}(X; R), the cohomology ring of X with coefficients in R, is a graded ring whose underlying group is $\bigoplus_{i = 0}^\infty H^i(X; R)$ with the multiplicative structure given by the cup product.

== Graded module ==
The corresponding idea in module theory is that of a graded module, namely a left module M over a graded ring R such that

$$M = \bigoplus_{i\in \mathbb{N}}M_i ,$$

and

$$R_iM_j \subseteq M_{i+j}$$

for every i and j.

Examples:

- A graded vector space is an example of a graded module over a field (with the field having trivial grading).
- A graded ring is a graded module over itself. An ideal in a graded ring is homogeneous if and only if it is a graded submodule. The annihilator of a graded module is a homogeneous ideal.
- Given an ideal I in a commutative ring R and an R-module M, the direct sum $\bigoplus_{n=0}^{\infty} I^n M/I^{n+1} M$ is a graded module over the associated graded ring $\bigoplus_0^{\infty} I^n/I^{n+1}$.

A morphism $f: N \to M$ of graded modules, called a graded morphism or graded homomorphism , is a homomorphism of the underlying modules that respects grading; i.e., $f(N_i) \subseteq M_i$. A graded submodule is a submodule that is a graded module in own right and such that the set-theoretic inclusion is a morphism of graded modules. Explicitly, a graded module N is a graded submodule of M if and only if it is a submodule of M and satisfies $N_i = N \cap M_i$. The kernel and the image of a morphism of graded modules are graded submodules.

Remark: To give a graded morphism from a graded ring to another graded ring with the image lying in the center is the same as to give the structure of a graded algebra to the latter ring.

Given a graded module $M$, the $\ell$-twist of $M$ is a graded module defined by $M(\ell)_n = M_{n+\ell}$ (cf. Serre's twisting sheaf in algebraic geometry).

Let M and N be graded modules. If $f\colon M \to N$ is a morphism of modules, then f is said to have degree d if $f(M_n) \subseteq N_{n+d}$. An exterior derivative of differential forms in differential geometry is an example of such a morphism having degree 1.

== Invariants of graded modules ==
Given a graded module M over a commutative graded ring R, one can associate the formal power series $P(M, t) \in \Z[\![t]\!]$:

$$P(M, t) = \sum \ell(M_n) t^n$$

(assuming $\ell(M_n)$ are finite.) It is called the Hilbert–Poincaré series of M.

A graded module is said to be finitely generated if the underlying module is finitely generated. The generators may be taken to be homogeneous (by replacing the generators by their homogeneous parts.)

Suppose R is a polynomial ring $k[x_0, \dots, x_n]$, k a field, and M a finitely generated graded module over it. Then the function $n \mapsto \dim_k M_n$ is called the Hilbert function of M. The function coincides with the integer-valued polynomial for large n called the Hilbert polynomial of M.

== Graded algebra ==
An associative algebra A over a ring R is a graded algebra if it is graded as a ring.

In the usual case where the ring R is not graded (in particular if R is a field), it is given the trivial grading (every element of R is of degree 0). Thus, $R\subseteq A_0$ and the graded pieces $A_i$ are R-modules.

In the case where the ring R is also a graded ring, then one requires that

$$R_iA_j \subseteq A_{i+j}$$

In other words, we require A to be a graded left module over R.

Examples of graded algebras are common in mathematics:

- Polynomial rings. The homogeneous elements of degree n are exactly the homogeneous polynomials of degree n.
- The tensor algebra $T^{\bullet} V$ of a vector space V. The homogeneous elements of degree n are the tensors of order n, $T^{n} V$.
- The exterior algebra $\textstyle\bigwedge\nolimits^{\bullet} V$ and the symmetric algebra $S^{\bullet} V$ are also graded algebras.
- The cohomology ring $H^{\bullet}$ in any cohomology theory is also graded, being the direct sum of the cohomology groups $H^n$.

Graded algebras are much used in commutative algebra and algebraic geometry, homological algebra, and algebraic topology. One example is the close relationship between homogeneous polynomials and projective varieties (cf. Homogeneous coordinate ring).

Another example of a graded algebra which is non-commutative is the Leavitt path algebra which has a natural $\mathbb{Z}$-grading.

== G-graded rings and algebras ==
The above definitions have been generalized to rings graded using any monoid G as an index set. A G-graded ring R is a ring with a direct sum decomposition

$$R = \bigoplus_{i\in G}R_i$$

such that

$$R_i R_j \subseteq R_{i \cdot j}.$$

Elements of R that lie inside $R_i$ for some $i \in G$ are said to be homogeneous of grade i.

The previously defined notion of "graded ring" now becomes the same thing as an $\N$-graded ring, where $\N$ is the monoid of natural numbers under addition. The definitions for graded modules and algebras can also be extended this way replacing the indexing set $\N$ with any monoid G.

Remarks:

- If we do not require that the ring have an identity element, semigroups may replace monoids.

Examples:

- A group naturally grades the corresponding group ring; similarly, monoid rings are graded by the corresponding monoid.
- An (associative) superalgebra is another term for a $\Z_2$-graded algebra. Examples include Clifford algebras. Here the homogeneous elements are either of degree 0 (even) or 1 (odd).

=== Anticommutativity ===
Some graded rings (or algebras) are endowed with an anticommutative structure. This notion requires a homomorphism of the monoid of the gradation into the additive monoid of $\Z/2\Z$, the field with two elements. Specifically, a signed monoid consists of a pair $(\Gamma, \varepsilon)$ where $\Gamma$ is a monoid and $\varepsilon \colon \Gamma \to\Z/2\Z$ is a homomorphism of additive monoids. An anticommutative $\Gamma$-graded ring is a ring A graded with respect to $\Gamma$ such that:

$$xy=(-1)^{\varepsilon (\deg x) \varepsilon (\deg y)}yx ,$$

for all homogeneous elements x and y.

=== Examples ===
- An exterior algebra is an example of an anticommutative algebra, graded with respect to the structure $(\Z, \varepsilon)$ where $\varepsilon \colon \Z \to\Z/2\Z$ is the quotient map.
- A supercommutative algebra (sometimes called a skew-commutative associative ring) is the same thing as an anticommutative $(\Z/2\Z, \varepsilon)$-graded algebra, where $\varepsilon$ is the identity map of the additive structure of $\Z/2\Z$.

== Graded monoid ==
Intuitively, a graded monoid is the subset of a graded ring, $\bigoplus_{n\in \mathbb N_0}R_n$, generated by the $R_n$'s, without using the additive part. That is, the set of elements of the graded monoid is $\bigcup_{n\in\mathbb N_0}R_n$.

Formally, a graded monoid is a monoid $(M,\cdot)$, with a gradation function $\phi:M\to\mathbb N_0$ such that $\phi(m\cdot m')=\phi(m)+\phi(m')$. Note that the gradation of $1_M$ is necessarily 0. Some authors request furthermore that $\phi(m)\ne 0$ when m is not the identity.

Assuming the gradations of non-identity elements are non-zero, the number of elements of gradation n is at most $g^n$ where g is the cardinality of a generating set G of the monoid. Therefore, the number of elements of gradation n or less is at most $n+1$ (for $g=1$) or $\frac{g^{n+1}-1}{g-1}$ else. Indeed, each such element is the product of at most n elements of G, and only $\frac{g^{n+1}-1}{g-1}$ such products exist. Similarly, the identity element can not be written as the product of two non-identity elements. That is, there is no unit divisor in such a graded monoid.

=== Power series indexed by a graded monoid ===
These notions allow us to extend the notion of power series ring. Instead of the indexing family being $\mathbb N$, the indexing family could be any graded monoid, assuming that the number of elements of degree n is finite, for each integer n.

More formally, let $(K,+_K,\times_K)$ be an arbitrary semiring and $(R,\cdot,\phi)$ a graded monoid. Then $K\langle\langle R\rangle\rangle$ denotes the semiring of power series with coefficients in K indexed by R. Its elements are functions from R to K. The sum of two elements $s,s'\in K\langle\langle R\rangle\rangle$ is defined pointwise, it is the function sending $m\in R$ to $s(m)+_Ks'(m)$, and the product is the function sending $m\in R$ to the infinite sum $\sum_{p,q \in R \atop p \cdot q=m}s(p)\times_K s'(q)$. This sum is correctly defined (i.e., finite) because, for each m, there are only a finite number of pairs (p, q) such that pq = m.

=== Free monoid ===
In formal language theory, given an alphabet A, the free monoid of words over A can be considered as a graded monoid, where the gradation of a word is its length.

== See also ==
- Associated graded ring
- Differential graded algebra
- Filtered algebra, a generalization
- Graded (mathematics)
- Graded category
- Graded vector space
- Tensor algebra
- Differential graded module

== Notes ==
=== References ===
- Lang, Serge (2002), Algebra, Graduate Texts in Mathematics, vol. 211 (Revised third ed.), New York: Springer-Verlag, ISBN 978-0-387-95385-4, MR 1878556.
- Bourbaki, N. (1974). "Ch. 1–3, 3 §3". Algebra I. Springer. ISBN 978-3-540-64243-5.
- Steenbrink, J. (1977). "Intersection form for quasi-homogeneous singularities" (PDF). Compositio Mathematica. 34 (2): 211–223 See p. 211. ISSN 0010-437X.
- Matsumura, H. (1989). "5 Dimension theory §S3 Graded rings, the Hilbert function and the Samuel function". Commutative Ring Theory. Cambridge Studies in Advanced Mathematics. Vol. 8. Translated by Reid, M. (2nd ed.). Cambridge University Press. ISBN 978-1-107-71712-1.
