= Associated graded ring =

In mathematics, the associated graded ring of a ring R with respect to a proper ideal I is the graded ring:

$$\operatorname{gr}_I R = \bigoplus_{n=0}^\infty I^n/I^{n+1}$$.

Similarly, if M is a left R-module, then the associated graded module is the graded module over $\operatorname{gr}_I R$:

$$\operatorname{gr}_I M = \bigoplus_{n=0}^\infty I^n M/ I^{n+1} M$$.

== Basic definitions and properties ==
For a ring R and ideal I, multiplication in $\operatorname{gr}_IR$ is defined as follows: First, consider homogeneous elements $a \in I^i/I^{i + 1}$ and $b \in I^j/I^{j + 1}$ and suppose $a' \in I^i$ is a representative of a and $b' \in I^j$ is a representative of b. Then define $ab$ to be the equivalence class of $a'b'$ in $I^{i + j}/I^{i + j + 1}$. Note that this is well-defined modulo $I^{i + j + 1}$. Multiplication of inhomogeneous elements is defined by using the distributive property.

A ring or module may be related to its associated graded ring or module through the initial form map. Let M be an R-module and I an ideal of R. Given $f \in M$, the initial form of f in $\operatorname{gr}_I M$, written $\mathrm{in}(f)$, is the equivalence class of f in $I^mM/I^{m+1}M$ where m is the maximum integer such that $f\in I^mM$. If $f \in I^mM$ for every m, then set $\mathrm{in}(f) = 0$. The initial form map is only a map of sets and generally not a homomorphism. For a submodule $N \subset M$, $\mathrm{in}(N)$ is defined to be the submodule of $\operatorname{gr}_I M$ generated by $\{\mathrm{in}(f) | f \in N\}$. This may not be the same as the submodule of $\operatorname{gr}_IM$ generated by the only initial forms of the generators of N.

A ring inherits some "good" properties from its associated graded ring. For example, if R is a noetherian local ring, and $\operatorname{gr}_I R$ is an integral domain, then R is itself an integral domain.

== gr of a quotient module ==
Let $N \subset M$ be left modules over a ring R and I an ideal of R. Since

$${I^n(M/N) \over I^{n+1}(M/N)} \simeq {I^n M + N \over I^{n+1}M + N} \simeq {I^n M \over I^n M \cap (I^{n+1} M + N)} = {I^n M \over I^n M \cap N + I^{n+1} M}$$

(the last equality is by modular law), there is a canonical identification:

$$\operatorname{gr}_I (M/N) = \operatorname{gr}_I M / \operatorname{in}(N)$$

where

$$\operatorname{in}(N) = \bigoplus_{n=0}^{\infty} {I^n M \cap N + I^{n+1} M \over I^{n+1} M},$$

called the submodule generated by the initial forms of the elements of $N$.

== Examples ==
Let U be the universal enveloping algebra of a Lie algebra $\mathfrak{g}$ over a field k; it is filtered by degree. The Poincaré–Birkhoff–Witt theorem implies that $\operatorname{gr} U$ is a polynomial ring; in fact, it is the coordinate ring $k[\mathfrak{g}^*]$.

The associated graded algebra of a Clifford algebra is an exterior algebra; i.e., a Clifford algebra degenerates to an exterior algebra.

== Generalization to multiplicative filtrations ==
The associated graded can also be defined more generally for multiplicative descending filtrations of R (see also filtered ring.) Let F be a descending chain of ideals of the form

$$R = I_0 \supset I_1 \supset I_2 \supset \dotsb$$

such that $I_jI_k \subset I_{j + k}$. The graded ring associated with this filtration is $\operatorname{gr}_F R = \bigoplus_{n=0}^\infty I_n/ I_{n+1}$. Multiplication and the initial form map are defined as above.

== See also ==
- Graded (mathematics)
- Rees algebra
