= Shigeru Mukai =

Japanese mathematician (born 1953)

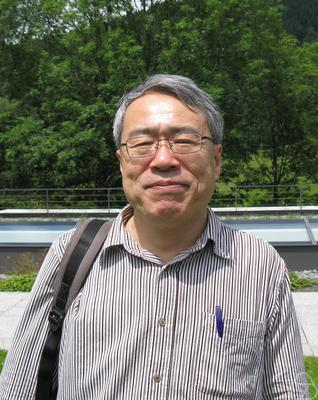
- Mukai at Oberwolfach in 2012
- Born: 1953 (age 72–73)
- Education: Kyoto University (Ph.D., 1982)
- Known for: Fourier–Mukai transform
- Awards: MSJ Autumn Prize (1996) Chunichi Culture Award (中日文化賞) (2000); Osaka Prize (2003)
- Scientific career
- Fields: Mathematics
- Workplaces: Kyoto University; Nagoya University

Shigeru Mukai (向井 茂, Mukai Shigeru; born 1953) is a Japanese mathematician at Kyoto University specializing in algebraic geometry.

== Work ==
He introduced the Fourier–Mukai transform in 1981 in a paper on abelian varieties, which also made up his doctoral thesis. His research since has included work on vector bundles on K3 surfaces, three-dimensional Fano varieties, moduli theory, and non-commutative Brill–Noether theory. He also found a new counterexample to Hilbert's 14th problem (the first counterexample was found by Nagata in 1959).

== Publications ==
- Mukai, Shigeru; Oxbury, W. M. (8 September 2003) [First published 1998], An Introduction to Invariants and Moduli, Cambridge Studies in Advanced Mathematics, vol. 81, Cambridge University Press, ISBN 978-0-521-80906-1, MR 2004218
- Mukai, Shigeru (5 December 2008), モジュライ理論（1） [Moduli Theory (1)], Iwanami Shoten, ISBN 978-400006057-8
- Mukai, Shigeru (5 December 2008), モジュライ理論（2） [Moduli Theory (2)], Iwanami Shoten, ISBN 978-400006058-5
- Mukai, Shigeru (1981). "Duality between $D(X)$ and $D(\hat X)$ with its application to Picard sheaves". Nagoya Mathematical Journal. 81: 153–175. doi:10.1017/S002776300001922X. ISSN 0027-7630.
