= Functionally graded element =

Elements used in finite element analysis

In materials science and mathematics, functionally graded elements are elements used in finite element analysis. They can be used to describe a functionally graded material.

== See also ==
- Graded (mathematics)
