= Differential graded category =

Concept in homological algebra

In mathematics, especially homological algebra, a differential graded category, often shortened to dg-category or DG category, is a category whose morphism sets are endowed with the additional structure of a differential graded $\Z$-module.

In detail, this means that $\operatorname{Hom}(A,B)$, the morphisms from any object A to another object B of the category is a direct sum

$$\bigoplus_{n \in \Z}\operatorname{Hom}_n(A,B)$$

and there is a differential d on this graded group, i.e., for each n there is a linear map

$$d\colon \operatorname{Hom}_n(A,B) \rightarrow \operatorname{Hom}_{n+1}(A,B)$$,

which has to satisfy $d \circ d = 0$. This is equivalent to saying that $\operatorname{Hom}(A,B)$ is a cochain complex. Furthermore, the composition of morphisms $\operatorname{Hom}(A,B) \otimes \operatorname{Hom}(B,C) \rightarrow \operatorname{Hom}(A,C)$ is required to be a map of complexes, and for all objects A of the category, one requires $d(\operatorname{id}_A) = 0$.

Equivalently, a DG-category is a category enriched over the monoidal category of cochain complexes of abelian groups.

== Examples ==
- Any additive category may be considered to be a DG-category by imposing the trivial grading (i.e. all $\mathrm{Hom}_n(-,-)$ vanish for $n\ne 0$) and trivial differential ($d=0$).
- A little bit more sophisticated is the category of complexes $C(\mathcal A)$ over an additive category $\mathcal A$. By definition, $\operatorname{Hom}_{C(\mathcal A), n} (A, B)$ is the group of maps $A \rightarrow B[n]$ which do not need to commute with the differentials of the complexes A and B, i.e.,

$$\mathrm{Hom}_{C(\mathcal A), n} (A, B) = \prod_{l \in \Z} \mathrm{Hom}(A_l, B_{l+n})$$.

The differential of such a morphism $f = (f_l \colon A_l \rightarrow B_{l+n})$ of degree n is defined to be

$$f_{l+1} \circ d_A + (-1)^{n+1} d_B \circ f_l$$,

where $d_A, d_B$ are the differentials of A and B, respectively. This applies to the category of complexes of quasi-coherent sheaves on a scheme over a ring.

- A DG-category with one object is the same as a DG-ring. A DG-ring over a field is called DG-algebra, or differential graded algebra.

== Further properties ==
The category of small dg-categories can be endowed with a model category structure such that weak equivalences are those functors that induce an equivalence of derived categories.

Given a dg-category $\mathcal{C}$ over some ring $R$, there is a notion of smoothness and properness of $\mathcal{C}$ that reduces to the usual notions of smooth and proper morphisms in case $\mathcal{C}$ is the category of quasi-coherent sheaves on some scheme X over $R$.

== Relation to triangulated categories ==
A DG category C is called pre-triangulated if it has a suspension functor $\Sigma$ and a class of distinguished triangles compatible with the suspension, such that its homotopy category Ho(C) is a triangulated category. A triangulated category T is said to have a dg enhancement C if C is a pretriangulated dg category whose homotopy category is equivalent to T. dg enhancements of an exact functor between triangulated categories are defined similarly. In general, there need not exist dg enhancements of triangulated categories or functors between them, for example stable homotopy category can be shown not to arise from a dg category in this way. However, various positive results do exist, for example the derived category D(A) of a Grothendieck abelian category A admits a unique dg enhancement.

== See also ==
- Differential algebra
- Graded (mathematics)
- Graded category
- Derivator
