= Mapping cone (homological algebra) =

Tool in homological algebra

In homological algebra, the mapping cone is a construction on a map of chain complexes inspired by the analogous construction in topology. In the theory of triangulated categories it is a kind of combined kernel and cokernel: if the chain complexes take their terms in an abelian category, so that we can talk about cohomology, then the cone of a map f being acyclic means that the map is a quasi-isomorphism; if we pass to the derived category of complexes, this means that f is an isomorphism there, which recalls the familiar property of maps of groups, modules over a ring, or elements of an arbitrary abelian category that if the kernel and cokernel both vanish, then the map is an isomorphism. If we are working in a t-category, then in fact the cone furnishes both the kernel and cokernel of maps between objects of its core.

== Definition ==
The cone may be defined in the category of cochain complexes over any additive category (i.e., a category whose morphisms form abelian groups and in which we may construct a direct sum of any two objects). Let $A, B$ be two complexes, with differentials $d_A, d_B;$ i.e.,

$$A = \dots \to A^{n - 1} \xrightarrow{d_A^{n - 1}} A^n \xrightarrow{d_A^n} A^{n + 1} \to \cdots$$

and likewise for $B.$

For a map of complexes $f : A \to B,$ we define the cone, often denoted by $\operatorname{Cone}(f)$ or $C(f),$ to be the following complex:

$C(f) = A[1] \oplus B = \dots \to A^n \oplus B^{n - 1} \to A^{n + 1} \oplus B^n \to A^{n + 2} \oplus B^{n + 1} \to \cdots$ on terms,

with differential

$$d_{C(f)} = \begin{pmatrix} d_{A[1]} & 0 \\ f[1] & d_B \end{pmatrix}$$
(acting as though on column vectors).

Here $A[1]$ is the complex with $A[1]^n=A^{n + 1}$ and $d^n_{A[1]}=-d^{n + 1}_{A}$. Note that the differential on $C(f)$ is different from the natural differential on $A[1] \oplus B$, and that some authors use a different sign convention.

Thus, if for example our complexes are of abelian groups, the differential would act as

$$\begin{array}{ccl}
d^n_{C(f)}(a^{n + 1}, b^n) &=&  \begin{pmatrix} d^n_{A[1]} & 0 \\ f[1]^n & d^n_B \end{pmatrix} \begin{pmatrix} a^{n + 1} \\ b^n \end{pmatrix} \\
&=& \begin{pmatrix} - d^{n + 1}_A & 0 \\ f^{n + 1} & d^n_B \end{pmatrix} \begin{pmatrix} a^{n + 1} \\ b^n \end{pmatrix} \\
&=& \begin{pmatrix} - d^{n + 1}_A (a^{n + 1}) \\ f^{n + 1}(a^{n + 1}) + d^n_B(b^n) \end{pmatrix}\\
&=& \left(- d^{n + 1}_A (a^{n + 1}), f^{n + 1}(a^{n + 1}) + d^n_B(b^n)\right).
\end{array}$$

== Properties ==
Suppose now that we are working over an abelian category, so that the homology of a complex is defined. The main use of the cone is to identify quasi-isomorphisms: if the cone is acyclic, then the map is a quasi-isomorphism. To see this, we use the existence of a triangle

$$A \xrightarrow{f} B \to C(f) \to A[1]$$

where the maps $B \to C(f), C(f) \to A[1]$ are given by the direct summands (see Homotopy category of chain complexes). Since this is a triangle, it gives rise to a long exact sequence on homology groups:

$$\dots \to H_{i - 1}(C(f)) \to H_i(A) \xrightarrow{f^*} H_i(B) \to H_i(C(f)) \to \cdots$$

and if $C(f)$ is acyclic then by definition, the outer terms above are zero. Since the sequence is exact, this means that $f^*$ induces an isomorphism on all homology groups, and hence (again by definition) is a quasi-isomorphism.

This fact recalls the usual alternative characterization of isomorphisms in an abelian category as those maps whose kernel and cokernel both vanish. This appearance of a cone as a combined kernel and cokernel is not accidental; in fact, under certain circumstances the cone literally embodies both. Say for example that we are working over an abelian category and $A, B$ have only one nonzero term in degree 0:

$$A = \dots \to 0 \to A_0 \to 0 \to \cdots,$$
$$B = \dots \to 0 \to B_0 \to 0 \to \cdots,$$

and therefore $f \colon A \to B$ is just $f_0 \colon A_0 \to B_0$ (as a map of objects of the underlying abelian category). Then the cone is just

$$C(f) = \dots \to 0 \to \underset{[-1]}{A_0} \xrightarrow{f_0} \underset{[0]}{B_0} \to 0 \to \cdots.$$

(Underset text indicates the degree of each term.) The homology of this complex is then

$$H_{-1}(C(f)) = \operatorname{ker}(f_0),$$
$$H_0(C(f)) = \operatorname{coker}(f_0),$$
$$H_i(C(f)) = 0 \text{ for } i \neq -1, 0.\$$

This is not an accident and in fact occurs in every t-category.

== Mapping cylinder ==
A related notion is the mapping cylinder: let $f\colon A \to B$ be a morphism of chain complexes, let further $g \colon \operatorname{Cone}(f)[-1] \to A$ be the natural map. The mapping cylinder of f is by definition the mapping cone of g.

== Topological inspiration ==
This complex is called the cone in analogy to the mapping cone (topology) of a continuous map of topological spaces $\phi : X \rightarrow Y$: the complex of singular chains of the topological cone $cone(\phi)$ is homotopy equivalent to the cone (in the chain-complex-sense) of the induced map of singular chains of X to Y. The mapping cylinder of a map of complexes is similarly related to the mapping cylinder of continuous maps.
