= Differential graded Lie algebra =

In mathematics, in particular abstract algebra and topology, a differential graded Lie algebra (or dg Lie algebra, or dgla) is a graded vector space with added Lie algebra and chain complex structures that are compatible. Such objects have applications in deformation theory and rational homotopy theory.

== Definition ==
A differential graded Lie algebra is a graded vector space $L = \bigoplus L_i$ over a field of characteristic zero together with a bilinear map $[\cdot,\cdot]\colon L_i \otimes L_j \to L_{i+j}$ and a differential $d: L_i \to L_{i-1}$ satisfying

$$[x,y] = (-1)^{|x||y|+1}[y,x],$$

the graded Jacobi identity:

$$(-1)^{|x||z|}[x,[y,z]] +(-1)^{|y||x|}[y,[z,x]] +(-1)^{|z||y|}[z,[x,y]] = 0,$$

and the graded Leibniz rule:

$$d [x,y] = [d x,y] + (-1)^{|x|}[x, d y]$$

for any homogeneous elements x, y and z in L. Notice here that the differential lowers the degree and so this differential graded Lie algebra is considered to be homologically graded. If instead the differential raised degree the differential graded Lie algebra is said to be cohomologically graded (usually to reinforce this point the grading is written in superscript: $L^i$). The choice of cohomological grading usually depends upon personal preference or the situation as they are equivalent: a homologically graded space can be made into a cohomological one via setting $L^i=L_{-i}$.

Alternative equivalent definitions of a differential graded Lie algebra include:

1. a Lie algebra object internal to the category of chain complexes;
2. a strict $L_\infty$-algebra.

A morphism of differential graded Lie algebras is a graded linear map $f:L\to L^\prime$ that commutes with the bracket and the differential, i.e., $f [x,y]_{L} = [f(x),f(y)]_{L^\prime}$ and $f (d_L x) = d_{L^\prime} f (x)$. Differential graded Lie algebras and their morphisms define a category.

== Products and coproducts ==
The product of two differential graded Lie algebras, $L\times L^\prime$, is defined as follows: take the direct sum of the two graded vector spaces $L\oplus L^\prime$, and equip it with the bracket $[(x,x^\prime),(y,y^\prime)]=([x,y],[x^\prime,y^\prime])$ and differential $D(x,x^\prime ) = (dx,d^\prime x^\prime)$.

The coproduct of two differential graded Lie algebras, $L*L^\prime$, is often called the free product. It is defined as the free graded Lie algebra on the two underlying vector spaces with the unique differential extending the two original ones modulo the relations present in either of the two original Lie algebras.

== Connection to deformation theory ==
The main application is to the deformation theory over fields of characteristic zero (in particular over the complex numbers.) The idea goes back to Daniel Quillen's work on rational homotopy theory. One way to formulate this thesis (due to Vladimir Drinfeld, Boris Feigin, Pierre Deligne, Maxim Kontsevich, and others) might be:

Any reasonable formal deformation problem in characteristic zero can be described by Maurer–Cartan elements of an appropriate differential graded Lie algebra.

A Maurer-Cartan element is a degree −1 element, $x\in L_{-1}$, that is a solution to the Maurer–Cartan equation:

$$dx +\frac{1}{2}[x,x]=0.$$

== See also ==
- Differential graded algebra (DGA)
- Simplicial Lie algebra
- Homotopy Lie algebra
