= Rees algebra =

Construction in commutative algebra

In commutative algebra, the Rees algebra or Rees ring of an ideal I in a commutative ring R is defined to be

$R[It]=\bigoplus_{n=0}^{\infty} I^n t^{n}\subseteq R[t].$

The extended Rees algebra of I (which some authors refer to as the Rees algebra of I) is defined as

$R[It,t^{-1}]=\bigoplus_{n=-\infty}^{\infty}I^nt^{n}\subseteq R[t,t^{-1}].$

This construction has special interest in algebraic geometry since the projective scheme defined by the Rees algebra of an ideal in a ring is the blowing-up of the spectrum of the ring along the subscheme defined by the ideal (see Ideal sheaf § Algebraic geometry).

== Properties ==
The Rees algebra is an algebra over $\mathbb{Z}[t^{-1}]$, and it is defined so that, quotienting by $t^{-1}=0$ or t=λ for λ any invertible element in R, we get

$\text{gr}_I R \ \leftarrow\ R[It]\ \to\ R.$

Thus it interpolates between R and its associated graded ring gr_{I}R.

- Assume R is Noetherian; then R[It] is also Noetherian. The Krull dimension of the Rees algebra is $\dim R[It]=\dim R+1$ if I is not contained in any prime ideal P with $\dim(R/P)=\dim R$; otherwise $\dim R[It]=\dim R$. The Krull dimension of the extended Rees algebra is $\dim R[It, t^{-1}]=\dim R+1$.
- If $J\subseteq I$ are ideals in a Noetherian ring R, then the ring extension $R[Jt]\subseteq R[It]$ is integral if and only if J is a reduction of I.
- If I is an ideal in a Noetherian ring R, then the Rees algebra of I is the quotient of the symmetric algebra of I by its torsion submodule.

== Relationship with other blow-up algebras ==
The associated graded ring of I may be defined as

$\operatorname{gr}_I(R)=R[It]/IR[It].$

If R is a Noetherian local ring with maximal ideal $\mathfrak{m}$, then the special fiber ring of I is given by

$\mathcal{F}_I(R)=R[It]/\mathfrak{m}R[It].$

The Krull dimension of the special fiber ring is called the analytic spread of I.
