= Differential graded module =

Mathematical concept

In algebra, a differential graded module, or dg-module, is a $\mathbb{Z}$-graded module together with a differential; i.e., a square-zero graded endomorphism of the module of degree 1 or −1, depending on the convention. In other words, it is a chain complex having a structure of a module, while a differential graded algebra is a chain complex with a structure of an algebra.

In view of the module-variant of Dold–Kan correspondence, the notion of an $\mathbb{N}_0$-graded dg-module is equivalent to that of a simplicial module; "equivalent" in the categorical sense; see § The Dold–Kan correspondence below.

== The Dold–Kan correspondence ==
Given a commutative ring R, by definition, the category of simplicial modules are simplicial objects in the category of R-modules; denoted by sMod_{R}. Then sMod_{R} can be identified with the category of differential graded modules which vanish in negative degrees via the Dold-Kan correspondence.

== See also ==
- Differential graded Lie algebra
