= Fourier–Mukai transform =

In algebraic geometry, a Fourier–Mukai transform Φ_{K} is a functor between derived categories of coherent sheaves D(X) → D(Y) for schemes X and Y, which is, in a sense, an integral transform along a kernel object K ∈ D(X×Y). Most natural functors, including basic ones like pushforwards and pullbacks, are of this type.

These kinds of functors were introduced by Mukai (1981) in order to prove an equivalence between the derived categories of coherent sheaves on an abelian variety and its dual. That equivalence is analogous to the classical Fourier transform that gives an isomorphism between tempered distributions on a finite-dimensional real vector space and its dual.

== Definition ==
Let X and Y be smooth projective varieties, K ∈ D^{b}(X×Y) an object in the derived category of coherent sheaves on their product. Denote by q the projection X×Y→X, by p the projection X×Y→Y. Then the Fourier-Mukai transform Φ_{K} is a functor D^{b}(X)→D^{b}(Y) given by

$$\mathcal{F} \mapsto \mathrm{R}p_*\left(q^*\mathcal{F} \otimes^{L} K\right)$$

where Rp_{*} is the derived direct image functor and $\otimes^L$ is the derived tensor product.

Fourier-Mukai transforms always have left and right adjoints, both of which are also kernel transformations. Given two kernels K_{1} ∈ D^{b}(X×Y) and K_{2} ∈ D^{b}(Y×Z), the composed functor Φ_{K_{2}} $\circ$ Φ_{K_{1}} is also a Fourier-Mukai transform.

The structure sheaf of the diagonal $\mathcal{O}_{\Delta} \in \mathrm{D}^b(X \times X)$, taken as a kernel, produces the identity functor on D^{b}(X). For a morphism f:X→Y, the structure sheaf of the graph Γ_{f} produces a pushforward when viewed as an object in D^{b}(X×Y), or a pullback when viewed as an object in D^{b}(Y×X).

== On abelian varieties ==
Let $X$ be an abelian variety and $\hat X$ be its dual variety. The Poincaré bundle $\mathcal P$ on $X \times \hat X$, normalized to be trivial on the fiber at zero, can be used as a Fourier-Mukai kernel. Let $p$ and $\hat p$ be the canonical projections. The corresponding Fourier–Mukai functor with kernel $\mathcal P$ is then

$$R\mathcal S: \mathcal F \in D(X) \mapsto R\hat p_\ast (p^\ast \mathcal F \otimes \mathcal P) \in D(\hat X)$$

There is a similar functor

$$R\widehat{\mathcal S} : D(\hat X) \to D(X). \,$$

If the canonical class of a variety is ample or anti-ample, then the derived category of coherent sheaves determines the variety. In general, an abelian variety is not isomorphic to its dual, so this Fourier–Mukai transform gives examples of different varieties (with trivial canonical bundles) that have equivalent derived categories.

Let g denote the dimension of X. The Fourier–Mukai transformation is nearly involutive :

$$R\mathcal S \circ R\widehat{\mathcal S} = (-1)^\ast [-g]$$

It interchanges Pontrjagin product and tensor product.

$$R\mathcal S(\mathcal F \ast \mathcal G)  = R\mathcal S(\mathcal F) \otimes R\mathcal S(\mathcal G)$$
$$R\mathcal S(\mathcal F \otimes \mathcal G)  = R\mathcal S(\mathcal F) \ast R\mathcal S(\mathcal G)[g]$$

Deninger & Murre (1991) have used the Fourier-Mukai transform to prove the Künneth decomposition for the Chow motives of abelian varieties.

== Applications in string theory ==
In string theory, T-duality (short for target space duality), which relates two quantum field theories or string theories with different spacetime geometries, is closely related with the Fourier-Mukai transformation.

== See also ==
- Derived noncommutative algebraic geometry
