= Simplicial Lie algebra =

In algebra, a simplicial Lie algebra is a simplicial object in the category of Lie algebras. In particular, it is a simplicial abelian group, and thus is subject to the Dold–Kan correspondence.

== See also ==
- Differential graded Lie algebra
