= Graded category =

In mathematics, if $\mathcal{A}$ is a category, then a $\mathcal{A}$-graded category is a category $\mathcal{C}$ together with a functor $F\colon\mathcal{C} \rightarrow \mathcal{A}$.

Monoids and groups can be thought of as categories with a single object. A monoid-graded or group-graded category is therefore one in which to each morphism is attached an element of a given monoid (resp. group), its grade. This must be compatible with composition, in the sense that compositions have the product grade.

== Definition ==
There are various different definitions of a graded category, up to the most abstract one given above. A more concrete definition of a graded abelian category is as follows:

Let $\mathcal{C}$ be an abelian category and $G$ a monoid. Let $\mathcal{S} = \{ S_g : g \in G \}$ be a set of functors from $\mathcal{C}$ to itself. If

- $S_1$ is the identity functor on $\mathcal{C}$,
- $S_g S_h = S_{gh}$ for all $g,h \in G$ and
- $S_g$ is a full and faithful functor for every $g\in G$

we say that $(\mathcal{C},\mathcal{S})$ is a $G$-graded category.

== See also ==
- Differential graded category
- Graded (mathematics)
- Graded algebra
- Slice category
