= Graded vector space =

Algebraic structure decomposed into a direct sum

In mathematics, a graded vector space is a vector space that has the extra structure of a grading or gradation, which is a decomposition of the vector space into a direct sum of vector subspaces, generally indexed by the integers.

For "pure" vector spaces, the concept has been introduced in homological algebra, and it is widely used for graded algebras, which are graded vector spaces with additional structures.

== Integer gradation ==
Let $\mathbb{N}$ be the set of non-negative integers. An $\mathbb{N}$-graded vector space, often called simply a graded vector space without the prefix $\mathbb{N}$, is a vector space V together with a decomposition into a direct sum of the form

$$V = \bigoplus_{n \in \mathbb{N}} V_n$$

where each $V_n$ is a vector space. For a given n the elements of $V_n$ are then called homogeneous elements of degree n.

Graded vector spaces are common. For example the set of all polynomials in one or several variables forms a graded vector space, where the homogeneous elements of degree n are exactly the linear combinations of monomials of degree n.

== General gradation ==
The subspaces of a graded vector space need not be indexed by the set of natural numbers, and may be indexed by the elements of any set I. An I-graded vector space V is a vector space together with a decomposition into a direct sum of subspaces indexed by elements i of the set I:

$$V = \bigoplus_{i \in I} V_i.$$

Therefore, an $\mathbb{N}$-graded vector space, as defined above, is just an I-graded vector space where the set I is $\mathbb{N}$ (the set of natural numbers).

The case where I is the ring $\mathbb{Z}/2\mathbb{Z}$ (the elements 0 and 1) is particularly important in physics. A $(\mathbb{Z}/2\mathbb{Z})$-graded vector space is also known as a supervector space.

== Homomorphisms ==
For general index sets I, a linear map between two I-graded vector spaces f : V → W is called a graded linear map if it preserves the grading of homogeneous elements. A graded linear map is also called a homomorphism (or morphism) of graded vector spaces, or homogeneous linear map:

$f(V_i)\subseteq W_i$ for all i in I.

For a fixed field and a fixed index set, the graded vector spaces form a category whose morphisms are the graded linear maps.

When I is a commutative monoid (such as the natural numbers), then one may more generally define linear maps that are homogeneous of any degree i in I by the property

$f(V_j)\subseteq W_{i+j}$ for all j in I,

where "+" denotes the monoid operation. If moreover I satisfies the cancellation property so that it can be embedded into an abelian group A that it generates (for instance the integers if I is the natural numbers), then one may also define linear maps that are homogeneous of degree i in A by the same property (but now "+" denotes the group operation in A). Specifically, for i in I a linear map will be homogeneous of degree −i if

$f(V_{i+j})\subseteq W_j$ for all j in I, while
$f(V_j)=0\,$ if j − i is not in I.

Just as the set of linear maps from a vector space to itself forms an associative algebra (the algebra of endomorphisms of the vector space), the sets of homogeneous linear maps from a space to itself – either restricting degrees to I or allowing any degrees in the group A – form associative graded algebras over those index sets.

== Operations on graded vector spaces ==
Some operations on vector spaces can be defined for graded vector spaces as well.

Given two $I$-graded vector spaces $V$ and $W$, their direct sum has underlying vector space $V\oplus W$ with gradation
$$(V\oplus W)_i=V_i\oplus W_i.$$

If $I$ is a semigroup, then the tensor product of two $I$-graded vector spaces $V$ and $W$ is another $I$-graded vector space, $V \otimes W$, with gradation
$$(V \otimes W)_i = \bigoplus_{\left\{\left(j,k\right) \,:\; j+k=i\right\}} V_j \otimes W_k.$$

== Hilbert–Poincaré series ==
Given a $\N$-graded vector space that is finite-dimensional for every $n\in \N,$ its Hilbert–Poincaré series is the formal power series

$$\sum_{n\in\N}\dim_K(V_n)\, t^n.$$

From the formulas above, the Hilbert–Poincaré series of a direct sum and of a tensor product of graded vector spaces (finite dimensional in each degree) are respectively the sum and the product of the corresponding Hilbert–Poincaré series.

== See also ==
- Graded (mathematics)
- Graded algebra
- Comodule
- Graded module
- Littlewood–Richardson rule
