= Pseudo-abelian category =

In mathematics, specifically in category theory, a pseudo-abelian category is a category that is preadditive and is such that every idempotent has a kernel. Recall that an idempotent morphism $p$ is an endomorphism of an object with the property that $p\circ p = p$. Elementary considerations show that every idempotent then has a cokernel. The pseudo-abelian condition is stronger than preadditivity, but it is weaker than the requirement that every morphism have a kernel and cokernel, as is true for abelian categories.

Synonyms in the literature for pseudo-abelian include pseudoabelian and Karoubian.

== Examples ==
Any abelian category, in particular the category Ab of abelian groups, is pseudo-abelian. Indeed, in an abelian category, every morphism has a kernel.

The category of rngs (not rings!) together with multiplicative morphisms is pseudo-abelian.

A more complicated example is the category of Chow motives. The construction of Chow motives uses the pseudo-abelian completion described below.

== Pseudo-abelian completion ==
The Karoubi envelope construction associates to an arbitrary category $C$ a category $\operatorname{Kar}C$ together with a functor

$$s:C \to \operatorname{Kar}C$$

such that the image $s(p)$ of every idempotent $p$ in $C$ splits in $\operatorname{Kar}C$. When applied to a preadditive category $C$, the Karoubi envelope construction yields a pseudo-abelian category $\operatorname{Kar}C$ called the pseudo-abelian completion or pseudo-abelian envelope of $C$. Moreover, the functor

$$C \to \operatorname{Kar}C$$

is in fact an additive morphism.

To be precise, given a preadditive category $C$ we construct a pseudo-abelian category $\operatorname{Kar}C$ in the following way. The objects of $\operatorname{Kar}C$ are pairs $(X,p)$ where $X$ is an object of $C$ and $p$ is an idempotent of $X$. The morphisms

$$f:(X,p) \to (Y,q)$$

in $\operatorname{Kar}C$ are those morphisms

$$f:X \to Y$$

such that $f = q \circ f = f \circ p$ in $C$. The functor

$$C \to \operatorname{Kar}C$$

is given by taking $X$ to $(X, \mathrm{id}_X)$.
