= Derived category =

Homological construction

In mathematics, the derived category D(A) of an abelian category A is a construction of homological algebra introduced to refine and in a certain sense to simplify the theory of derived functors defined on A. The construction proceeds on the basis that the objects of D(A) should be chain complexes in A, with two such chain complexes considered isomorphic when there is a chain map that induces an isomorphism on the level of homology of the chain complexes. Derived functors can then be defined for chain complexes, refining the concept of hypercohomology. The definitions lead to a significant simplification of formulas otherwise described (not completely faithfully) by complicated spectral sequences.

The development of the derived category, by Alexander Grothendieck and his student Jean-Louis Verdier shortly after 1960, now appears as one terminal point in the explosive development of homological algebra in the 1950s, a decade in which it had made remarkable strides. The basic theory of Verdier was written down in his dissertation, published finally in 1996 in Astérisque (a summary had earlier appeared in SGA 4½). The axiomatics required an innovation, the concept of triangulated category, and the construction is based on localization of a category, a generalization of localization of a ring. The original impulse to develop the "derived" formalism came from the need to find a suitable formulation of Grothendieck's coherent duality theory. Derived categories have since become indispensable also outside of algebraic geometry, for example in the formulation of the theory of D-modules and microlocal analysis. Recently derived categories have also become important in areas nearer to physics, such as D-branes and mirror symmetry.

Unbounded derived categories were introduced by Spaltenstein in 1988.

== Motivations ==
In coherent sheaf theory, pushing to the limit of what could be done with Serre duality without the assumption of a non-singular scheme, the need to take a whole complex of sheaves in place of a single dualizing sheaf became apparent. In fact the Cohen–Macaulay ring condition, a weakening of non-singularity, corresponds to the existence of a single dualizing sheaf; and this is far from the general case. From the top-down intellectual position, always assumed by Grothendieck, this signified a need to reformulate. With it came the idea that the 'real' tensor product and Hom functors would be those existing on the derived level; with respect to those, Tor and Ext become more like computational devices.

Despite the level of abstraction, derived categories became accepted over the following decades, especially as a convenient setting for sheaf cohomology. Perhaps the biggest advance was the formulation of the Riemann–Hilbert correspondence in dimensions greater than 1 in derived terms, around 1980. The Sato school adopted the language of derived categories, and the subsequent history of D-modules was of a theory expressed in those terms.

A parallel development was the category of spectra in homotopy theory. The homotopy category of spectra and the derived category of a ring are both examples of triangulated categories.

== Definition ==
Let $\mathcal{A}$ be an abelian category. (Examples include the category of modules over a ring and the category of sheaves of abelian groups on a topological space.) The derived category $D(\mathcal{A})$ is defined by a universal property with respect to the category $\operatorname{Kom}(\mathcal{A})$ of cochain complexes with terms in $\mathcal{A}$. The objects of $\operatorname{Kom}(\mathcal{A})$ are of the form

$$\cdots \to
X^{-1} \xrightarrow{d^{-1}}
X^0 \xrightarrow{d^0}
X^1 \xrightarrow{d^1}
X^2 \to \cdots,$$

where each X^{i} is an object of $\mathcal{A}$ and each of the composites $d^{i+1} \circ d^i$ is zero. The ith cohomology group of the complex is $H^i(X^\bullet) = \operatorname{ker} d^i / \operatorname{im} d^{i-1}$. If $(X^\bullet, d_X^\bullet)$ and $(Y^\bullet, d_Y^\bullet)$ are two objects in this category, then a morphism $f^\bullet \colon (X^\bullet, d_X^\bullet) \to (Y^\bullet, d_Y^\bullet)$ is defined to be a family of morphisms $f_i \colon X^i \to Y^i$ such that $f_{i+1} \circ d_X^i = d_Y^i \circ f_i$. Such a morphism induces morphisms on cohomology groups $H^i(f^\bullet) \colon H^i(X^\bullet) \to H^i(Y^\bullet)$, and $f^\bullet$ is called a quasi-isomorphism if each of these morphisms is an isomorphism in $\mathcal{A}$.

The universal property of the derived category is that it is a localization of the category of complexes with respect to quasi-isomorphisms. Specifically, the derived category $D(\mathcal{A})$ is a category, together with a functor $Q \colon \operatorname{Kom}(\mathcal{A}) \to D(\mathcal{A})$, having the following universal property: Suppose $\mathcal{C}$ is another category (not necessarily abelian) and $F \colon \operatorname{Kom}(\mathcal{A}) \to \mathcal{C}$ is a functor such that, whenever $f^\bullet$ is a quasi-isomorphism in $\operatorname{Kom}(\mathcal{A})$, its image $F(f^\bullet)$ is an isomorphism in $\mathcal{C}$; then $F$ factors through $Q$. Any two categories having this universal property are equivalent.

=== Relation to the homotopy category ===
If $f$ and $g$ are two morphisms $X^\bullet \to Y^\bullet$ in $\operatorname{Kom}(\mathcal{A})$, then a chain homotopy or simply homotopy $h \colon f \to g$ is a collection of morphisms $h^i \colon X^i \to Y^{i-1}$ such that $f^i - g^i = d_Y^{i-1} \circ h^i + h^{i+1} \circ d_X^i$ for every i. It is straightforward to show that two homotopic morphisms induce identical morphisms on cohomology groups. We say that $f \colon X^\bullet \to Y^\bullet$ is a chain homotopy equivalence if there exists $g \colon Y^\bullet \to X^\bullet$ such that $g \circ f$ and $f \circ g$ are chain homotopic to the identity morphisms on $X^\bullet$ and $Y^\bullet$, respectively. The homotopy category of cochain complexes $K(\mathcal{A})$ is the category with the same objects as $\operatorname{Kom}(\mathcal{A})$ but whose morphisms are equivalence classes of morphisms of complexes with respect to the relation of chain homotopy. There is a natural functor $\operatorname{Kom}(\mathcal{A}) \to K(\mathcal{A})$ which is the identity on objects and which sends each morphism to its chain homotopy equivalence class. Since every chain homotopy equivalence is a quasi-isomorphism, $Q$ factors through this functor. Consequently $D(\mathcal{A})$ can be equally well viewed as a localization of the homotopy category.

From the point of view of model categories, the derived category D(A) is the true 'homotopy category' of the category of complexes, whereas K(A) might be called the 'naive homotopy category'.

=== Constructing the derived category ===
There are several possible constructions of the derived category. When $\mathcal{A}$ is a small category, then there is a direct construction of the derived category by formally adjoining inverses of quasi-isomorphisms. This is an instance of the general construction of a category by generators and relations.

When $\mathcal{A}$ is a large category, this construction does not work for set theoretic reasons. This construction builds morphisms as equivalence classes of paths. If $\mathcal{A}$ has a proper class of objects, all of which are isomorphic, then there is a proper class of paths between any two of these objects. The generators and relations construction therefore only guarantees that the morphisms between two objects form a proper class. However, the morphisms between two objects in a category are usually required to be sets, and so this construction fails to produce an actual category.

Even when $\mathcal{A}$ is small, however, the construction by generators and relations generally results in a category whose structure is opaque, where morphisms are arbitrarily long paths subject to a mysterious equivalence relation. For this reason, it is conventional to construct the derived category more concretely even when set theory is not at issue.

These other constructions go through the homotopy category. The collection of quasi-isomorphisms in $K(\mathcal{A})$ forms a multiplicative system. This is a collection of conditions that allow complicated paths to be rewritten as simpler ones. The Gabriel–Zisman theorem implies that localization at a multiplicative system has a simple description in terms of roofs. A morphism $X^\bullet \to Y^\bullet$ in $D(\mathcal{A})$ may be described as a pair $(s, f)$, where for some complex $Z^\bullet$, $s \colon Z^\bullet \to X^\bullet$ is a quasi-isomorphism and $f \colon Z^\bullet \to Y^\bullet$ is a chain homotopy equivalence class of morphisms. Conceptually, this represents $f \circ s^{-1}$. Two roofs are equivalent if they have a common overroof.

Replacing chains of morphisms with roofs also enables the resolution of the set-theoretic issues involved in derived categories of large categories. Fix a complex $X^\bullet$ and consider the category $I_{X^\bullet}$ whose objects are quasi-isomorphisms in $K(\mathcal{A})$ with codomain $X^\bullet$ and whose morphisms are commutative diagrams. Equivalently, this is the category of objects over $X^\bullet$ whose structure maps are quasi-isomorphisms. Then the multiplicative system condition implies that the morphisms in $D(\mathcal{A})$ from $X^\bullet$ to $Y^\bullet$ are

$$\varinjlim_{I_{X^\bullet}} \operatorname{Hom}_{K(\mathcal{A})}((X')^\bullet, Y^\bullet),$$

assuming that this colimit is in fact a set. While $I_{X^\bullet}$ is potentially a large category, in some cases it is controlled by a small category. This is the case, for example, if $\mathcal{A}$ is a Grothendieck abelian category (meaning that it satisfies AB5 and has a set of generators), with the essential point being that only objects of bounded cardinality are relevant. In these cases, the limit may be calculated over a small subcategory, and this ensures that the result is a set. Then $D(\mathcal{A})$ may be defined to have these sets as its $\operatorname{Hom}$ sets.

There is a different approach based on replacing morphisms in the derived category by morphisms in the homotopy category. A morphism in the derived category with codomain being a bounded below complex of injective objects is the same as a morphism to this complex in the homotopy category; this follows from termwise injectivity. By replacing termwise injectivity by a stronger condition, one gets a similar property that applies even to unbounded complexes. A complex $I^\bullet$ is K-injective if, for every acyclic complex $X^\bullet$, we have $\operatorname{Hom}_{K(\mathcal{A})}(X^\bullet, I^\bullet) = 0$. A straightforward consequence of this is that, for every complex $X^\bullet$, morphisms $X^\bullet \to I^\bullet$ in $K(\mathcal{A})$ are the same as such morphisms in $D(\mathcal{A})$. A theorem of Serpé, generalizing work of Grothendieck and of Spaltenstein, asserts that in a Grothendieck abelian category, every complex is quasi-isomorphic to a K-injective complex with injective terms, and moreover, this is functorial. In particular, we may define morphisms in the derived category by passing to K-injective resolutions and computing morphisms in the homotopy category. The functoriality of Serpé's construction ensures that composition of morphisms is well-defined. Like the construction using roofs, this construction also ensures suitable set theoretic properties for the derived category, this time because these properties are already satisfied by the homotopy category.

== Derived Hom-sets ==
As noted before, in the derived category the hom sets are expressed through roofs, or valleys $X \rightarrow Y' \leftarrow Y$, where $Y \to Y'$ is a quasi-isomorphism. To get a better picture of what elements look like, consider an exact sequence

$$0 \to \mathcal{E}_n \overset{\phi_{n,n-1}}{\rightarrow} \mathcal{E}_{n-1} \overset{\phi_{n-1,n-2}}{\rightarrow} \cdots \overset{\phi_{1,0}}{\rightarrow} \mathcal{E}_0 \to 0$$

We can use this to construct a morphism $\phi: \mathcal{E}_0 \to \mathcal{E}_n[+(n-1)]$ by truncating the complex above, shifting it, and using the obvious morphisms above. In particular, we have the picture

$$\begin{matrix}
0 &\to& \mathcal{E}_n &\to & 0 & \to & \cdots & \to & 0 & \to & 0\\
\uparrow &  & \uparrow & & \uparrow & & \cdots &  & \uparrow & & \uparrow \\
0 &\to& \mathcal{E}_n& \to &\mathcal{E}_{n-1} & \to & \cdots & \to &\mathcal{E}_1 &\to &0 \\
\downarrow& & \downarrow & & \downarrow & & \cdots & & \downarrow & & \downarrow \\
0 & \to & 0 & \to & 0 & \to & \cdots & \to & \mathcal{E}_0 &\to& 0
\end{matrix}$$

where the bottom complex has $\mathcal{E}_0$ concentrated in degree $0$, the only non-trivial upward arrow is the equality morphism, and the only-nontrivial downward arrow is $\phi_{1,0}:\mathcal{E}_1 \to \mathcal{E}_0$. This diagram of complexes defines a morphism

$$\phi \in \mathbf{RHom}(\mathcal{E}_0, \mathcal{E}_n[+(n-1)])$$

in the derived category. One application of this observation is the construction of the Atiyah-class.

== Remarks ==
For certain purposes (see below) one uses bounded-below ($X^n = 0$ for $n \ll 0$), bounded-above ($X^n = 0$ for $n \gg 0$) or bounded ($X^n = 0$ for $|n| \gg 0$) complexes instead of unbounded ones. The corresponding derived categories are usually denoted D^{+}(A), D^{−}(A) and D^{b}(A), respectively.

If one adopts the classical point of view on categories, that there is a set of morphisms from one object to another (not just a class), then one has to give an additional argument to prove this. If, for example, the abelian category A is small, i.e. has only a set of objects, then this issue will be no problem. Also, if A is a Grothendieck abelian category, then the derived category D(A) is equivalent to a full subcategory of the homotopy category K(A), and hence has only a set of morphisms from one object to another. Grothendieck abelian categories include the category of modules over a ring, the category of sheaves of abelian groups on a topological space, and many other examples.

Composition of morphisms, i.e. roofs, in the derived category is accomplished by finding a third roof on top of the two roofs to be composed. It may be checked that this is possible and gives a well-defined, associative composition.

Since K(A) is a triangulated category, its localization D(A) is also triangulated. For an integer n and a complex X, define the complex X[n] to be X shifted down by n, so that

$$X[n]^{i} = X^{n+i},$$

with differential

$$d_{X[n]} = (-1)^n d_X.$$

By definition, a distinguished triangle in D(A) is a triangle that is isomorphic in D(A) to the triangle X → Y → Cone(f) → X[1] for some map of complexes f: X → Y. Here Cone(f) denotes the mapping cone of f. In particular, for a short exact sequence

$$0 \rightarrow X \rightarrow Y \rightarrow Z \rightarrow 0$$

in A, the triangle X → Y → Z → X[1] is distinguished in D(A). Verdier explained that the definition of the shift X[1] is forced by requiring X[1] to be the cone of the morphism X → 0.

By viewing an object of A as a complex concentrated in degree zero, the derived category D(A) contains A as a full subcategory. Morphisms in the derived category include information about all Ext groups: for any objects X and Y in A and any integer j,

$$\text{Hom}_{D(\mathcal{A})}(X,Y[j]) = \text{Ext}^j_{\mathcal{A}}(X,Y).$$

== Projective and injective resolutions ==
One can easily show that a homotopy equivalence is a quasi-isomorphism, so the second step in the above construction may be omitted. The definition is usually given in this way because it reveals the existence of a canonical functor

$$K(\mathcal A) \rightarrow D(\mathcal A).$$

In concrete situations, it is very difficult or impossible to handle morphisms in the derived category directly. Therefore, one looks for a more manageable category which is equivalent to the derived category. Classically, there are two (dual) approaches to this: projective and injective resolutions. In both cases, the restriction of the above canonical functor to an appropriate subcategory will be an equivalence of categories.

In the following we will describe the role of injective resolutions in the context of the derived category, which is the basis for defining right derived functors, which in turn have important applications in cohomology of sheaves on topological spaces or more advanced cohomology theories like étale cohomology or group cohomology.

In order to apply this technique, one has to assume that the abelian category in question has enough injectives, which means that every object X of the category admits a monomorphism to an injective object I. (Neither the map nor the injective object has to be uniquely specified.) For example, every Grothendieck abelian category has enough injectives. Embedding X into some injective object I^{0}, the cokernel of this map into some injective I^{1} etc., one constructs an injective resolution of X, i.e. an exact (in general infinite) sequence

$$0 \rightarrow X \rightarrow I^0 \rightarrow I^1 \rightarrow \cdots, \,$$

where the I* are injective objects. This idea generalizes to give resolutions of bounded-below complexes X, i.e. X^{n} = 0 for sufficiently small n. As remarked above, injective resolutions are not uniquely defined, but it is a fact that any two resolutions are homotopy equivalent to each other, i.e. isomorphic in the homotopy category. Moreover, morphisms of complexes extend uniquely to a morphism of two given injective resolutions.

This is the point where the homotopy category comes into play again: mapping an object X of A to (any) injective resolution I* of A extends to a functor

$$D^+(\mathcal A) \rightarrow K^+(\mathrm{Inj}(\mathcal A))$$

from the bounded below derived category to the bounded below homotopy category of complexes whose terms are injective objects in A.

It is not difficult to see that this functor is actually inverse to the restriction of the canonical localization functor mentioned in the beginning. In other words, morphisms Hom(X,Y) in the derived category may be computed by resolving both X and Y and computing the morphisms in the homotopy category, which is at least theoretically easier. In fact, it is enough to resolve Y: for any complex X and any bounded below complex Y of injectives,

$$\mathrm{Hom}_{D(A)}(X, Y) = \mathrm{Hom}_{K(A)}(X, Y).$$

Dually, assuming that A has enough projectives, i.e. for every object X there is an epimorphism from a projective object P to X, one can use projective resolutions instead of injective ones.

In 1988 Spaltenstein defined an unbounded derived category (Spaltenstein (1988)) which immediately proved useful in the study of singular spaces; see, for example, the book by Kashiwara and Schapira (Categories and Sheaves) on various applications of unbounded derived category. Spaltenstein used so-called K-injective and K-projective resolutions.

Keller (1994) and May (2006) describe the derived category of modules over DG-algebras. Keller also gives applications to Koszul duality, Lie algebra cohomology, and Hochschild homology.

More generally, carefully adapting the definitions, it is possible to define the derived category of an exact category (Keller 1996).

== The relation to derived functors ==
The derived category is a natural framework to define and study derived functors. In the following, let F: A → B be a functor of abelian categories. There are two dual concepts:

- right derived functors come from left exact functors and are calculated via injective resolutions
- left derived functors come from right exact functors and are calculated via projective resolutions

In the following we will describe right derived functors. So, assume that F is left exact. Typical examples are F: A → Ab given by X ↦ Hom(X, A) or X ↦ Hom(A, X) for some fixed object A, or the global sections functor on sheaves or the direct image functor. Their right derived functors are Ext^{n}(–,A), Ext^{n}(A,–), H^{n}(X, F) or R^{n}f_{∗} (F), respectively.

The derived category allows us to encapsulate all derived functors R^{n}F in one functor, namely the so-called total derived functor RF: D^{+}(A) → D^{+}(B). It is the following composition: D^{+}(A) ≅ K^{+}(Inj(A)) → K^{+}(B) → D^{+}(B), where the first equivalence of categories is described above. The classical derived functors are related to the total one via R^{n}F(X) = H^{n}(RF(X)). One might say that the R^{n}F forget the chain complex and keep only the cohomologies, whereas RF does keep track of the complexes.

Derived categories are, in a sense, the "right" place to study these functors. For example, the Grothendieck spectral sequence of a composition of two functors

$$\mathcal A \stackrel{F}{\rightarrow} \mathcal B \stackrel{G}{\rightarrow} \mathcal C, \,$$

such that F maps injective objects in A to G-acyclics (i.e. R^{i}G(F(I)) = 0 for all i > 0 and injective I), is an expression of the following identity of total derived functors

$$R(G \circ F) \cong RG \circ RF.$$

J.-L. Verdier showed how derived functors associated with an abelian category A can be viewed as Kan extensions along embeddings of A into suitable derived categories [Mac Lane].

== Derived equivalence ==
It may happen that two abelian categories A and B are not equivalent, but their derived categories D(A) and D(B) are. Often this is an interesting relation between A and B. Such equivalences are related to the theory of t-structures in triangulated categories. Here are some examples.

- Let $\mathrm{Coh}(\mathbb{P}^1)$ be an abelian category of coherent sheaves on the projective line over a field k. Let K_{2}-Rep be an abelian category of representations of the Kronecker quiver with two vertices. They are very different abelian categories, but their (bounded) derived categories are equivalent.
- Let Q be any quiver and P be a quiver obtained from Q by reversing some arrows. In general, the categories of representations of Q and P are different, but D^{b}(Q-Rep) is always equivalent to D^{b}(P-Rep).
- Let X be an abelian variety, Y its dual abelian variety. Then D^{b}(Coh(X)) is equivalent to D^{b}(Coh(Y)) by the theory of Fourier–Mukai transforms. Varieties with equivalent derived categories of coherent sheaves are sometimes called Fourier–Mukai partners.

== See also ==
- Homotopy category of chain complexes
- Derived noncommutative algebraic geometry
- Coherent sheaf cohomology
- Coherent duality
- Derived algebraic geometry
