= Quasi-isomorphism =

In homological algebra, a branch of mathematics, a quasi-isomorphism or quism is a morphism A → B of chain complexes (respectively, cochain complexes) such that the induced morphisms

$$H_n(A_\bullet) \to H_n(B_\bullet)\ (\text{respectively, } H^n(A^\bullet) \to H^n(B^\bullet))$$

of homology groups (respectively, of cohomology groups) are isomorphisms for all n.

In the theory of model categories, quasi-isomorphisms are sometimes used as the class of weak equivalences when the objects of the category are chain or cochain complexes. This results in a homology-local theory, in the sense of Bousfield localization in homotopy theory.

== See also ==
- Chain homotopy equivalence
- Derived category
