= Gerbe =

Construct in mathematics

In mathematics, a gerbe (/dʒɜːrb/; French: [ʒɛʁb]) is a construct in homological algebra and topology. Gerbes were introduced by Jean Giraud (Giraud 1971) following ideas of Alexandre Grothendieck as a tool for non-commutative cohomology in degree 2. They can be seen as an analogue of fibre bundles where the fibre is the classifying stack of a group. Gerbes provide a convenient, if highly abstract, language for dealing with many types of deformation questions especially in modern algebraic geometry. In addition, special cases of gerbes have been used more recently in differential topology and differential geometry to give alternative descriptions to certain cohomology classes and additional structures attached to them.

"Gerbe" is a French (and archaic English) word that literally means "wheat sheaf."

== Definitions ==
=== Gerbes on a topological space ===
A gerbe on a topological space $S$ is a stack $\mathcal{X}$ of groupoids over $S$ that is locally non-empty (each point $p \in S$ has an open neighbourhood $U_p$ over which the section category $\mathcal{X}(U_p)$ of the gerbe is not empty) and transitive (for any two objects $a$ and $b$ of $\mathcal{X}(U)$ for any open set $U$, there is an open covering $\mathcal{U} = \{U_i \}_{i \in I}$ of $U$ such that the restrictions of $a$ and $b$ to each $U_i$ are connected by at least one morphism).

A canonical example is the gerbe $BH$ of principal bundles with a fixed structure group $H$: the section category over an open set $U$ is the category of principal $H$-bundles on $U$ with isomorphism as morphisms (thus the category is a groupoid). As principal bundles glue together (satisfy the descent condition), these groupoids form a stack. The trivial bundle $X \times H \to X$ shows that the local non-emptiness condition is satisfied, and finally as principal bundles are locally trivial, they become isomorphic when restricted to sufficiently small open sets; thus the transitivity condition is satisfied as well.

=== Gerbes on a site ===
The most general definition of gerbes are defined over a site. Given a site $\mathcal{C}$ a $\mathcal{C}$-gerbe $G$ is a category fibered in groupoids $G \to \mathcal{C}$ such that

1. There exists a refinement $\mathcal{C}'$ of $\mathcal{C}$ such that for every object $S \in \text{Ob}(\mathcal{C}')$ the associated fibered category $G_S$ is non-empty
2. For every $S \in \text{Ob}(\mathcal{C})$ any two objects in the fibered category $G_S$ are locally isomorphic

Note that for a site $\mathcal{C}$ with a final object $e$, a category fibered in groupoids $G \to \mathcal{C}$ admits a local section if and only if $\text{Ob}(G_e) \neq \varnothing$, in which case $G \to \mathcal{C}$ automatically satisfies the first axiom.

==== Motivation for gerbes on a site ====
One of the main motivations for considering gerbes on a site is to consider the following naive question: if the Čech cohomology group $H^1(\mathcal{U},G)$ for a suitable covering $\mathcal{U} = \{U_i\}_{i \in I}$ of a space $X$ gives the isomorphism classes of principal $G$-bundles over $X$, what does the iterated cohomology functor $H^1(-,H^1(-,G))$ represent? Meaning, we are gluing together the groups $H^1(U_i,G)$ via some 1-cocycle. Gerbes are a technical response for this question: they give geometric representations of elements in the higher cohomology group $H^2(\mathcal{U},G)$. It is expected this intuition should hold for higher gerbes.

== Cohomological classification ==
One of the main theorems concerning gerbes is their cohomological classification whenever they have automorphism groups given by a fixed sheaf of abelian groups $\underline{L}$, called a band. For a gerbe $\mathcal{X}$ on a site $\mathcal{C}$, an object $U \in \text{Ob}(\mathcal{C})$, and an object $x \in \text{Ob}(\mathcal{X}(U))$, the automorphism group of a gerbe is defined as the automorphism group $L = \underline{\text{Aut}}_{\mathcal{X}(U)}(x)$. Notice this is well defined whenever the automorphism group is always the same. Given a covering $\mathcal{U} = \{U_i \to X \}_{i \in I}$, there is an associated class

$c(\underline{L}) \in H^3(X,\underline{L})$

representing the isomorphism class of the gerbe $\mathcal{X}$ banded by $L$. For example, in topology, many examples of gerbes can be constructed by considering gerbes banded by the group $U(1)$. As the classifying space $B(U(1)) = K(\mathbb{Z},2)$ is the second Eilenberg–Maclane space for the integers, a bundle gerbe banded by $U(1)$ on a topological space $X$ is constructed from a homotopy class of maps in

$[X, B^2(U(1))] = [X,K(\mathbb{Z},3)]$,

which is exactly the third singular homology group $H^3(X,\mathbb{Z})$. It has been found that all gerbes representing torsion cohomology classes in $H^3(X,\mathbb{Z})$ are represented by a bundle of finite dimensional algebras $\text{End}(V)$ for a fixed complex vector space $V$. In addition, the non-torsion classes are represented as infinite-dimensional principal bundles $PU(\mathcal{H})$ of the projective group of unitary operators on a fixed infinite dimensional separable Hilbert space $\mathcal{H}$. Note this is well defined because all separable Hilbert spaces are isomorphic to the space of square-summable sequences $\ell^2$. The homotopy-theoretic interpretation of gerbes comes from looking at the homotopy fiber square

$$\begin{matrix}
\mathcal{X} & \to & * \\
\downarrow &  & \downarrow \\
S & \xrightarrow{f} & B^2U(1)
\end{matrix}$$

analogous to how a line bundle comes from the homotopy fiber square

$$\begin{matrix}
L & \to & * \\
\downarrow &  & \downarrow \\
S & \xrightarrow{f} & BU(1)
\end{matrix}$$

where $BU(1) \simeq K(\mathbb{Z},2)$, giving $H^2(S,\mathbb{Z})$ as the group of isomorphism classes of line bundles on $S$.

== Examples ==
=== C*-algebras ===
There are natural examples of Gerbes that arise from studying the algebra of compactly supported complex valued functions on a paracompact space $X$^{pg 3}. Given a cover $\mathcal{U} = \{U_i\}$ of $X$ there is the Čech groupoid defined as

$\mathcal{G} = \left\{ \coprod_{i,j}U_{ij} \rightrightarrows \coprod U_i \right\}$

with source and target maps given by the inclusions

$$\begin{align}
s: U_{ij} \hookrightarrow U_j \\
t: U_{ij} \hookrightarrow U_i
\end{align}$$

and the space of composable arrows is just

$\coprod_{i,j,k}U_{ijk}$

Then a degree 2 cohomology class $\sigma \in H^2(X;U(1))$ is just a map

$\sigma: \coprod U_{ijk} \to U(1)$

We can then form a non-commutative C*-algebra $C_c(\mathcal{G}(\sigma))$, which is associated to the set of compact supported complex valued functions of the space

$\mathcal{G}_1 = \coprod_{i,j}U_{ij}$

It has a non-commutative product given by

$a* b(x,i,k) := \sum_j a(x,i,j)b(x,j,k)\sigma(x,i,j,k)$

where the cohomology class $\sigma$ twists the multiplication of the standard $C^*$-algebra product.

=== Algebraic geometry ===
Let $M$ be a variety over an algebraically closed field $k$, $G$ an algebraic group, for example $\mathbb{G}_m$. Recall that a G-torsor over $M$ is an algebraic space $P$ with an action of $G$ and a map $\pi:P\to M$, such that locally on $M$ (in étale topology or fppf topology) $\pi$ is a direct product $\pi|_U:G\times U\to U$. A G-gerbe over M may be defined in a similar way. It is an Artin stack $\mathcal{M}$ with a map $\pi\colon\mathcal{M} \to M$, such that locally on M (in étale or fppf topology) $\pi$ is a direct product $\pi|_U\colon \mathrm{B}G \times U \to U$. Here $BG$ denotes the classifying stack of $G$, i.e. a quotient $[ * / G ]$ of a point by a trivial $G$-action. There is no need to impose the compatibility with the group structure in that case since it is covered by the definition of a stack. The underlying topological spaces of $\mathcal{M}$ and $M$ are the same, but in $\mathcal{M}$ each point is equipped with a stabilizer group isomorphic to $G$.

==== From two-term complexes of coherent sheaves ====
Every two-term complex of coherent sheaves

$\mathcal{E}^\bullet = [\mathcal{E}^{-1} \xrightarrow{d} \mathcal{E}^0]$

on a scheme $X \in \text{Sch}$ has a canonical sheaf of groupoids associated to it, where on an open subset $U \subseteq X$ there is a two-term complex of $X(U)$-modules

$\mathcal{E}^{-1}(U) \xrightarrow{d} \mathcal{E}^0(U)$

giving a groupoid. It has objects given by elements $x \in \mathcal{E}^0(U)$ and a morphism $x \to x'$ is given by an element $y \in \mathcal{E}^{-1}(U)$ such that

$dy + x = x'$

In order for this stack to be a gerbe, the cohomology sheaf $\mathcal{H}^0(\mathcal{E})$ must always have a section. This hypothesis implies the category constructed above always has objects. Note this can be applied to the situation of comodules over Hopf-algebroids to construct algebraic models of gerbes over affine or projective stacks (projectivity if a graded Hopf-algebroid is used). In addition, two-term spectra from the stabilization of the derived category of comodules of Hopf-algebroids $(A,\Gamma)$ with $\Gamma$ flat over $A$ give additional models of gerbes that are non-strict.

==== Moduli stack of stable bundles on a curve ====
Consider a smooth projective curve $C$ over $k$ of genus $g > 1$. Let $\mathcal{M}^s_{r, d}$ be the moduli stack of stable vector bundles on $C$ of rank $r$ and degree $d$. It has a coarse moduli space $M^s_{r, d}$, which is a quasiprojective variety. These two moduli problems parametrize the same objects, but the stacky version remembers automorphisms of vector bundles. For any stable vector bundle $E$ the automorphism group $Aut(E)$ consists only of scalar multiplications, so each point in a moduli stack has a stabilizer isomorphic to $\mathbb{G}_m$. It turns out that the map $\mathcal{M}^s_{r, d} \to M^{s}_{r, d}$ is indeed a $\mathbb{G}_m$-gerbe in the sense above. It is a trivial gerbe if and only if $r$ and $d$ are coprime.

==== Root stacks ====
Another class of gerbes can be found using the construction of root stacks. Informally, the $r$-th root stack of a line bundle $L \to S$ over a scheme is a space representing the $r$-th root of $L$ and is denoted

$\sqrt[r]{L/S}.\,$^{pg 52}

The $r$-th root stack of $L$ has the property

$\bigotimes^r\sqrt[{r}]{L/S} \cong L$

as gerbes. It is constructed as the stack

$\sqrt[r]{L/S}: (\operatorname{Sch}/S)^{op} \to \operatorname{Grpd}$

sending an $S$-scheme $T \to S$ to the category whose objects are line bundles of the form

$\left\{ (M \to T,\alpha_M) : \alpha_M: M^{\otimes r} \xrightarrow{\sim} L\times_ST \right\}$

and morphisms are commutative diagrams compatible with the isomorphisms $\alpha_M$. This gerbe is banded by the algebraic group of roots of unity $\mu_r$, where on a cover $T \to S$ it acts on a point $(M\to T,\alpha_M)$ by cyclically permuting the factors of $M$ in $M^{\otimes r}$. Geometrically, these stacks are formed as the fiber product of stacks

$$\begin{matrix}
S\times_{B\mathbb{G}_m} B\mathbb{G}_m & \to & B\mathbb{G}_m \\
\downarrow & & \downarrow \\
S & \to & B\mathbb{G}_m
\end{matrix}$$

where the vertical map of $B\mathbb{G}_m \to B\mathbb{G}_m$ comes from the Kummer sequence

$1 \xrightarrow{} \mu_r \xrightarrow{} \mathbb{G}_m \xrightarrow{ (\cdot)^r} \mathbb{G}_m \xrightarrow{} 1$

This is because $B\mathbb{G}_m$ is the moduli space of line bundles, so the line bundle $L \to S$ corresponds to an object of the category $B\mathbb{G}_m(S)$ (considered as a point of the moduli space).

==== Root stacks with sections ====
There is another related construction of root stacks with sections. Given the data above, let $s: S \to L$ be a section. Then the $r$-th root stack of the pair $(L\to S,s)$ is defined as the lax 2-functor

$\sqrt[r]{(L,s)/S}: (\operatorname{Sch}/S)^{op} \to \operatorname{Grpd}$

sending an $S$-scheme $T \to S$ to the category whose objects are line bundles of the form

$$\left\{
(M \to T,\alpha_M, t) :
\begin{align}
&\alpha_M: M^{\otimes r} \xrightarrow{\sim} L\times_ST \\
& t \in \Gamma(T,M) \\
&\alpha_M(t^{\otimes r}) = s
\end{align}
\right\}$$

and morphisms are given similarly. These stacks can be constructed very explicitly, and are well understood for affine schemes. In fact, these form the affine models for root stacks with sections. Locally, we may assume $S = \text{Spec}(A)$ and the line bundle $L$ is trivial, hence any section $s$ is equivalent to taking an element $s \in A$. Then, the stack is given by the stack quotient

$\sqrt[r]{(L,s)/S} = [\text{Spec}(B)/\mu_r]$

with

$B = \frac{A[x]}{x^r - s}$

If $s = 0$ then this gives an infinitesimal extension of $[\text{Spec}(A)/\mu_r]$.

==== Examples throughout algebraic geometry ====
These and more general kinds of gerbes arise in several contexts as both geometric spaces and as formal bookkeeping tools:

- Azumaya algebras
- Deformations of infinitesimal thickenings
- Twisted forms of projective varieties
- Fiber functors for motives

=== Differential geometry ===
- $H^3(X,\mathbb{Z})$ and $\mathcal{O}_X^*$-gerbes: Jean-Luc Brylinski's approach

== History ==
Gerbes first appeared in the context of algebraic geometry. They were subsequently developed in a more traditional geometric framework by Brylinski (Brylinski 1993). One can think of gerbes as being a natural step in a hierarchy of mathematical objects providing geometric realizations of integral cohomology classes.

A more specialised notion of gerbe was introduced by Murray and called bundle gerbes. Essentially they are a smooth version of abelian gerbes belonging more to the hierarchy starting with principal bundles than sheaves. Bundle gerbes have been used in gauge theory and also string theory. Current work by others is developing a theory of non-abelian bundle gerbes.

== See also ==
- Twisted sheaf
- Azumaya algebra
- Twisted K-theory
- Algebraic stack
- Bundle gerbe
- String group
