= String group =

Infinite-dimensional group in topology

In topology, a branch of mathematics, a string group is an infinite-dimensional group $\operatorname{String}(n)$ introduced by Stephan Stolz as a 3-connected cover of a spin group. A string manifold is a manifold with a lifting of its frame bundle to a string group bundle. This means that in addition to being able to define holonomy along paths, one can also define holonomies for surfaces going between strings. There is a short exact sequence of topological groups
$$0\rightarrow{K(\Z ,2)}\rightarrow \operatorname{String}(n)\rightarrow \operatorname{Spin}(n)\rightarrow 0$$
where $K(\Z,2)$ is an Eilenberg–MacLane space and $\operatorname{Spin}(n)$ is a spin group. The string group is an entry in the Whitehead tower (dual to the notion of Postnikov tower) for the orthogonal group:
$$\cdots\rightarrow \operatorname{Fivebrane}(n) \to \operatorname{String}(n)\rightarrow \operatorname{Spin}(n)\rightarrow \operatorname{SO}(n) \rightarrow \operatorname{O}(n)$$
It is obtained by killing the $\pi_3$ homotopy group for $\operatorname{Spin}(n)$, in the same way that $\operatorname{Spin}(n)$ is obtained from $\operatorname{SO}(n)$ by killing $\pi_1$. The resulting manifold cannot be any finite-dimensional Lie group, since all finite-dimensional compact Lie groups have a non-vanishing $\pi_3$. The fivebrane group follows, by killing $\pi_7$.

More generally, the construction of the Postnikov tower via short exact sequences starting with Eilenberg–MacLane spaces can be applied to any Lie group $G$, giving the string group $\operatorname{String}(G)$.

== Intuition for the string group ==
The relevance of the Eilenberg–MacLane space $K(\mathbb{Z},2)$ lies in the fact that there are the homotopy equivalences
$$K(\Z,1) \simeq U(1) \simeq B\Z$$
for the classifying space $B\Z$, and the fact $K(\Z,2) \simeq BU(1)$. Notice that because the complex spin group is a group extension
$$0\to K(\Z,1) \to \operatorname{Spin}^\C(n) \to \operatorname{Spin}(n) \to 0,$$
the String group can be thought of as a "higher" complex spin group extension (in the sense of higher group theory) since the space $K(\Z,2)$ is an example of a higher group. It can be thought of the topological realization of the groupoid $\mathbf{B}U(1)$ whose object is a single point and whose morphisms are the group $U(1)$. Note that the homotopical degree of $K(\Z,2)$ is $2$, meaning its homotopy is concentrated in degree $2$, because it comes from the homotopy fiber of the map
$$\operatorname{String}(n) \to \operatorname{Spin}(n)$$
from the Whitehead tower whose homotopy cokernel is $K(\Z,3)$. This is because the homotopy fiber lowers the degree by $1$.

=== Understanding the geometry ===
The geometry of String bundles requires the understanding of multiple constructions in homotopy theory, but they essentially boil down to understanding what $K(\Z,2)$-bundles are, and how these higher group extensions behave. Namely, $K(\Z,2)$-bundles on a space $M$ are represented geometrically as bundle gerbes since any $K(\Z,2)$-bundle can be realized as the homotopy fiber of a map giving a homotopy square
$$\begin{matrix}
P & \to & * \\
\downarrow & & \downarrow \\
M & \xrightarrow{} & K(\Z,3)
\end{matrix}$$
where $K(\Z,3) = B(K(\Z,2))$. Then, a string bundle $S \to M$ must map to a spin bundle $\mathbb{S} \to M$ which is $K(\Z,2)$-equivariant, analogously to how spin bundles map equivariantly to the frame bundle.

== Fivebrane group and higher groups ==
The fivebrane group can similarly be understood by killing the $\pi_7(\operatorname{Spin}(n)) \cong \pi_7(\operatorname{O}(n))$ group of the string group $\operatorname{String}(n)$ using the Whitehead tower. It can then be understood again using an exact sequence of higher groups
$$0 \to K(\mathbb{Z},6) \to \operatorname{Fivebrane}(n) \to \operatorname{String}(n) \to 0$$
giving a presentation of $\operatorname{Fivebrane}(n)$ it terms of an iterated extension, i.e. an extension by $K(\Z,6)$ by $\operatorname{String}(n)$. Note map on the right is from the Whitehead tower, and the map on the left is the homotopy fiber.

== See also ==
- Gerbe
- Elliptic cohomology
- N-group (category theory)
- String bordism
