= 2-group =

In mathematics, particularly category theory, a 2-group is a groupoid with a way to multiply objects and morphisms, making it resemble a group. They are part of a larger hierarchy of n-groups. They were introduced by Hoàng Xuân Sính in the late 1960s under the name gr-categories, and they are also known as categorical groups.

== Definition ==
A 2-group is a monoidal category G in which every morphism is invertible and every object has a weak inverse. (Here, a weak inverse of an object x is an object y such that xy and yx are both isomorphic to the unit object.)

== Strict 2-groups ==
Much of the literature focuses on strict 2-groups. A strict 2-group is a strict monoidal category in which every morphism is invertible and every object has a strict inverse (so that xy and yx are actually equal to the unit object).

A strict 2-group is a group object in a category of (small) categories; as such, they could be called groupal categories. Conversely, a strict 2-group is a category object in the category of groups; as such, they are also called categorical groups. They can also be identified with crossed modules, and are most often studied in that form. Thus, 2-groups in general can be seen as a weakening of crossed modules.

Every 2-group is equivalent to a strict 2-group, although this can't be done coherently: it doesn't extend to 2-group homomorphisms.

== Examples ==
Given a (small) category C, we can consider the 2-group Aut C. This is the monoidal category whose objects are the autoequivalences of C (i.e. equivalences F: C→C), whose morphisms are natural isomorphisms between such autoequivalences, and the multiplication of autoequivalences is given by their composition.

Given a topological space X and a point x in that space, there is a fundamental 2-group of X at x, written Π_{2}(X,x). As a monoidal category, the objects are loops at x, with multiplication given by concatenation, and the morphisms are basepoint-preserving homotopies between loops, with these morphisms identified if they are themselves homotopic.

== Properties ==
Weak inverses can always be assigned coherently: one can define a functor on any 2-group G that assigns a weak inverse to each object, so that each object is related to its designated weak inverse by an adjoint equivalence in the monoidal category G.

Given a bicategory B and an object x of B, there is an automorphism 2-group of x in B, written Aut_{B} x. The objects are the automorphisms of x, with multiplication given by composition, and the morphisms are the invertible 2-morphisms between these. If B is a 2-groupoid (so all objects and morphisms are weakly invertible) and x is its only object, then Aut_{B} x is the only data left in B. Thus, 2-groups may be identified with one-object 2-groupoids, much as groups may be identified with one-object groupoids and monoidal categories may be identified with one-object bicategories.

If G is a strict 2-group, then the objects of G form a group, called the underlying group of G and written G_{0}. This will not work for arbitrary 2-groups; however, if one identifies isomorphic objects, then the equivalence classes form a group, called the fundamental group of G and written π_{1}G. (Note that even for a strict 2-group, the fundamental group will only be a quotient group of the underlying group.)

As a monoidal category, any 2-group G has a unit object I_{G}. The automorphism group of I_{G} is an abelian group by the Eckmann–Hilton argument, written Aut(I_{G}) or π_{2}G.

The fundamental group of G acts on either side of π_{2}G, and the associator of G defines an element of the cohomology group H^{3}(π_{1}G, π_{2}G). In fact, 2-groups are classified in this way: given a group π_{1}, an abelian group π_{2}, a group action of π_{1} on π_{2}, and an element of H^{3}(π_{1}, π_{2}), there is a unique (up to equivalence) 2-group G with π_{1}G isomorphic to π_{1}, π_{2}G isomorphic to π_{2}, and the other data corresponding.

The element of H^{3}(π_{1}, π_{2}) associated to a 2-group is sometimes called its Sinh invariant, as it was developed by Grothendieck's student Hoàng Xuân Sính.

== Fundamental 2-group ==
As mentioned above, the fundamental 2-group of a topological space X and a point x is the 2-group Π_{2}(X,x), whose objects are loops at x, with multiplication given by concatenation, and the morphisms are basepoint-preserving homotopies between loops, with these morphisms identified if they are themselves homotopic.

Conversely, given any 2-group G, one can find a unique (up to weak homotopy equivalence) pointed connected space (X,x) whose fundamental 2-group is G and whose homotopy groups π_{n} are trivial for n > 2. In this way, 2-groups classify pointed connected weak homotopy 2-types. This is a generalisation of the construction of Eilenberg–Mac Lane spaces.

If X is a topological space with basepoint x, then the fundamental group of X at x is the same as the fundamental group of the fundamental 2-group of X at x; that is,
$$\pi_1(X,x) = \pi_1(\Pi_2(X,x)) .\!$$
This fact is the origin of the term "fundamental" in both of its 2-group instances.

Similarly,
$$\pi_2(X,x) = \pi_2(\Pi_2(X,x)) .\!$$
Thus, both the first and second homotopy groups of a space are contained within its fundamental 2-group. As this 2-group also defines an action of π_{1}(X,x) on π_{2}(X,x) and an element of the cohomology group H^{3}(π_{1}(X,x), π_{2}(X,x)), this is precisely the data needed to form the Postnikov tower of X if X is a pointed connected homotopy 2-type.

== See also ==
- n-group
- Abelian 2-group
