= Generalised Whitehead product =

The Whitehead product is a mathematical construction introduced in Whitehead (1941). It has been a useful tool in determining the properties of spaces. The mathematical notion of space includes every shape that exists in our 3-dimensional world such as curves, surfaces, and solid figures. Since spaces are often presented by formulas, it is usually not possible to visually determine their geometric properties. Some of these properties are connectedness (is the space in one or several pieces), the number of holes the space has, the knottedness of the space, and so on. Spaces are then studied by assigning algebraic constructions to them. This is similar to what is done in high school analytic geometry whereby to certain curves in the plane (geometric objects) are assigned equations (algebraic constructions). The most common algebraic constructions are groups. These are sets such that any two members of the set can be combined to yield a third member of the set (subject to certain restrictions). In homotopy theory, one assigns a group to each space X and positive integer p called the pth homotopy group of X. These groups have been studied extensively and give information about the properties of the space X. There are then operations among these groups (the Whitehead product) which provide additional information about the spaces. This has been very important in the study of homotopy groups.

Several generalisations of the Whitehead product appear in (Blakers & Massey 1953) and elsewhere, but the most far-reaching one deals with homotopy sets, that is, homotopy classes of maps from one space to another. The generalised Whitehead product assigns to an element α in the homotopy set [ΣA, X] and an element β in the homotopy set [ΣB, X], an element [α, β] in the homotopy set [Σ(A ∧ B), X], where A, B, and X are spaces, Σ is the suspension (topology), and ∧ is the smash product. This was introduced by Cohen (1957) and Hilton (1965) and later studied in detail by Arkowitz (1962), (see also Baues (1989), p. 157). It is a generalization of the Whitehead product and provides a useful technique in the investigation of homotopy sets.

The relevant MSC code is: 55Q15, Whitehead products and generalizations.

== Definition ==
Let $\alpha \in [\Sigma A, X]$ and $\beta \in [\Sigma B, X]$ and consider elements $\alpha(\Sigma \pi_A)$ and $\beta(\Sigma \pi_B) \in [\Sigma(A \times B), X]$, where $\pi_A$ and $\pi_B$ are the homotopy classes of the projection maps. The commutator

$$c(\alpha, \beta)=(\alpha(\Sigma \pi_A), \beta(\Sigma \pi_B)))$$

in the group $[\Sigma(A \times B), X]$ is trivial when restricted to $[\Sigma(A \vee B), X]$, where $\vee$ denotes wedge sum. The generalised Whitehead product is then defined as the unique element

$$[\alpha, \beta] \in [\Sigma(A \wedge B), X]$$

such that $[\alpha, \beta](\Sigma q) = c(\alpha, \beta)$, where $q \colon A \times B \to A \wedge B$ is the quotient map.

== Properties ==
Naturality: f_{∗}[α, β] = [f_{∗}(α), f_{∗}(β)], if $f\colon X \to Y$ is a map.

All [α, β] = 0, if X is an H-space.

E[α, β] = 0, where E : [Σ(A ∧ B), X] → [Σ^{2} (A ∧ B), ΣX] is the suspension homomorphism.

Bi-additivity, if A and B are suspensions.

A form of anti-commutativity.

An appropriate Jacobi identity for α and β as above and γ ∈ [ΣC, X], if A, B, and C are suspensions.

See Arkowitz (1962) for full statements of these results and proofs.

== Applications ==
The product ΣA × ΣB has the homotopy type of the mapping cone of [ι_{ΣA}, ι_{ΣB}] ∈ [Σ(A ∧ B), ΣA ∨ ΣB] (Arkowitz (1962)).

Whitehead products for homotopy groups with coefficients are obtained by taking A and B to be Moore spaces (Hilton (1965), pp. 110–114)

There is a weak homotopy equivalence between a wedge of suspensions of finitely many spaces and an infinite product of suspensions of various smash products of the spaces according to the Hilton–Milnor theorem. The map is defined by generalised Whitehead products (Baues & Quintero 2001).

== Related results ==
If Y is a group-like H-space, then a product [A, Y] × [B, Y] → [A ∧ B, Y] is defined in analogy with the generalised Whitehead product. This is the generalised Samelson product denoted <σ, τ> for σ ∈ [A, Y] and τ ∈ [B, Y] (Arkowitz 1963). If λ_{U,V} : [U, ΩV] → [ΣU, V] is the adjoint isomorphism, where Ω is the loop space functor, then λ_{A∧B,X}<σ, τ>= [λ_{A,X}(σ), λ_{B,X}(τ)] for Y = ΩX.

An Eckmann–Hilton dual of the generalised Whitehead product can be defined as follows. Let A♭B be the homotopy fiber of the inclusion j : A ∨ B → A × B, that is, the space of paths in A × B which begin in A ∨ B and end at the base point and let γ ∈ [X, ΩA] and δ ∈ [X, ΩB]. For (Ωι_{A})γ and (Ωι_{B})δ in [X, Ω(A ∨ B)], let d(γ, δ) ∈ [X, Ω(A ∨ B)] be their commutator. Since (Ωj) d(γ, δ) is trivial, there is a unique element {γ, δ} ∈ [X, Ω(A♭B)] such that (Ωp){γ, δ} = d(γ, δ), where p : A♭B → A ∨ B projects a path onto its initial point. For an application of this, let K(π, n) denote an Eilenberg–MacLane space and identify [X, K(π, n)] with the cohomology group H^{n}(X; π). If A = K(G, p) and B = K(G′, q), then there is a map θ : A♭B → K(G ⊗ G', p+q+1) such that (Ωθ){γ, δ} = γ ∪ δ, the cup product in H^{p+q}(X; G ⊗ G′). For details, see ((Arkowitz 1962), pp. 19–22) and (Arkowitz 1964).
