= Hopf–Whitney theorem =

In mathematics, especially algebraic topology and homotopy theory, the Hopf–Whitney theorem is a result relating the homotopy classes between a CW complex and a multiply connected space with singular cohomology classes of the former with coefficients in the first nontrivial homotopy group of the latter. It can for example be used to calculate cohomotopy as spheres are multiply connected.

== Statement ==
For a $n$-dimensional CW complex $X$ and a $n-1$-connected space $Y$, the well-defined map:

$$[X,Y]\rightarrow H^n(X,\pi_n(Y)),
[f]\mapsto f^*\iota$$

with a certain cohomology class $\iota\in H^n(Y,\pi_n(Y))$ is an isomorphism.

The Hurewicz theorem claims that the well-defined map $\pi_n(Y)\rightarrow H_n(Y,\mathbb{Z}),[f]\mapsto f_*[S^n]$ with a fundamental class $[S^n]\in H_n(S^n,\mathbb{Z})\cong\mathbb{Z}$ is an isomorphism and that $H_{n-1}(Y,\mathbb{Z})\cong 1$, which implies $\operatorname{Ext}_\mathbb{Z}^1(H_{n-1}(Y,\mathbb{Z}),\pi_n(Y))\cong 1$ for the Ext functor. The Universal coefficient theorem then simplifies and claims:

$$H^n(Y,\pi_n(Y))
\cong\operatorname{Hom}_\mathbb{Z}(H_n(Y,\mathbb{Z}),\pi_n(Y))
\cong\operatorname{End}_\mathbb{Z}(\pi_n(Y)).$$

$\iota\in H^n(Y,\pi_n(Y))$ is then the cohomology class corresponding to the identity $\operatorname{id} \in\operatorname{End}_\mathbb{Z}(\pi_n(Y))$.

In the Postnikov tower removing homotopy groups from above, the space $Y_n$ only has a single nontrivial homotopy group $\pi_n(Y_n)\cong\pi_n(Y)$ and hence is an Eilenberg–MacLane space $K(\pi_n(Y),n)$ (up to weak homotopy equivalence), which classifies singular cohomology. Combined with the canonical map $Y\rightarrow Y_n\simeq K(\pi_n(Y),n)$, the map from the Hopf–Whitney theorem can alternatively be expressed as a postcomposition:

$$[X,Y]\rightarrow[X,K(\pi_n(Y),n)]\cong H^n(X,\pi_n(Y)).$$

== Examples ==
For homotopy groups, cohomotopy sets or cohomology, the Hopf–Whitney theorem reproduces known results but weaker:

- For every $n-1$-connected space $Y$ one has:

$$[S^n,Y]
\cong H^n(S^n,\pi_n(Y))
\cong\pi_n(Y).$$
In general, this holds for every topological space by definition.

- For a $n$-dimensional CW complex $X$ one has:

$$[X,S^n]
\cong H^n(X,\pi_n(S^n))
\cong H^n(X,\mathbb{Z}).$$
For $n=1$, this also follows from $S^1\simeq K(\mathbb{Z},1)$.

- For a topological group $G$ and a natural number $n$, the Eilenberg–MacLane space $K(G,n)$ is $n-1$-connected by construction, hence for every $n-1$-dimensional CW-complex $X$ one has:

$$[X,K(G,n)]
\cong H^n\left(X,\pi_nK(G,n)\right)
\cong H^n(X,G)$$
In general, this holds for every topological space. The Hopf–Whitney theorem produces a weaker result because the fact that the higher homotopy groups of an Eilenberg–MacLane space also vanish does not enter.

== Literature ==
- Hopf, Heinz (1933). "Die Klassen der Abbildungen der n-dimensionalen Polyeder auf die n-dimensionale Sphäre". Commentarii Mathematici Helvetici. 5: 39–54. doi:10.1007/BF01297505.
- Whitney, Hassler (1937). "The maps of an n-complex into an n-sphere" (PDF). Duke Mathematical Journal. 3: 51–55.
