= Generalization of a Lie algebra =

Algebraic structure

In mathematics, a Lie algebra has been generalized in several ways.

== Graded Lie algebra and Lie superalgebra ==
A graded Lie algebra is a Lie algebra with grading. When the grading is $\mathbb{Z}/2$, it is also known as a Lie superalgebra.

== Lie-isotopic algebra ==
A Lie-isotopic algebra is a generalization of Lie algebras proposed by physicist R. M. Santilli in 1978.

=== Definition ===
Recall that a finite-dimensional Lie algebra $L$ with generators $X_1, X_2, ..., X_n$ and commutation rules

$$[X_i X_j] = X_i X_j - X_j X_i = C_{ij}^k X_k,$$

can be defined (particularly in physics) as the totally anti-symmetric algebra $A(L)^-$ attached to the universal enveloping associative algebra $A(L)=\{X_1, X_2, ..., X_n; X_iX_j, i, j = 1, ..., n; 1\}$ equipped with the associative product $X_i \times X_j$ over a numeric field $F$ with multiplicative unit $1$.

Consider now the axiom-preserving lifting of $A(L)$ into the form $A^*(L^*)=\{X_1, X_2, ..., X_n; X_i\times X_j, i, j = 1, ..., n; 1^*\}$, called universal enveloping isoassociative algebra, with isoproduct

$$X_i\times X_j = X_i T^* X_j,$$

verifying the isoassociative law

$$X_i\times (X_j  \times X_k) = X_i\times (X_j \times X_k)$$

and multiplicative isounit

$$1^* = 1/T*,  1^* \times X_k = X_k \times 1^* = X_k \forall  X_k  in A^*(L^*)$$

where $T^*$, called the isotopic element, is not necessarily an element of $A(L)$ which is solely restricted by the condition of being positive-definite, $T^* > 0$ , but otherwise having any desired dependence on local variables, and the products $X_i T^*, T^* X_j, etc.$ are conventional associative products in $A(L)$.

Then a Lie-isotopic algebra $L^*$ can be defined as the totally antisymmetric algebra attached to the enveloping isoassociative algebra. $L^* = A^*(L^*)^-$ with isocommutation rules

$$[X_i, X_j]^* = X_i \times X_j - X_j \times X_i = X_i T^* X_j - X_j T^* X_i = C_{ij}^{*k} X_k.$$

It is evident that: 1) The isoproduct and the isounit coincide at the abstract level with the conventional product and; 2) The isocommutators $[X_i, X_j]^*$ verify Lie's axioms; 3) In view of the infinitely possible isotopic elements $T^*$ (as numbers, functions, matrices, operators, etc.), any given Lie algebra $L$ admits an infinite class of isotopes; 4) Lie-isotopic algebras are called regular whenever $C_{ij}^{*k} = C_{ij}^{k}$, and irregular whenever $C_{ij}^{*k} \ne C_{ij}^{k}$. 5) All regular Lie-isotope $L^*$ are evidently isomorphic to $L$. However, the relationship between irregular isotopes $L^*$ and $L$ does not appear to have been studied to date (Jan. 20, 2024).

An illustration of the applications cf Lie-isotopic algebras in physics is given by the isotopes $SU^*(2)$ of the $SU(2)$-spin symmetry whose fundamental representation on a Hilbert space $H$ over the field of complex numbers $C$ can be obtained via the nonunitary transformation of the fundamental reopreserntation of $SU(2)$ (Pauli matrices)

$$\sigma^*_k =  U \sigma_k U^\dagger,$$

$$U U^\dagger =
I ^* = Diag. (\lambda^{-1}, \lambda), Det 1^* = 1,$$

$$\sigma^*_1= \left(\!
\begin{array}{cc}
0& \lambda\\
\lambda^{-1}& 0
\end{array}
\!\right),
\sigma^*_2 = \left(\!
\begin{array}{cc}
0& -i\! \lambda\\
i\! \lambda^{-1}& 0
\end{array}
\!\right),
\sigma^*_3 = \left(\!
\begin{array}{cc}
\lambda^{-1}& 0\\
0&  -\lambda
\end{array}
\!\right ),$$

providing an explicit and concrete realization of Bohm's hidden variables $\lambda$, which is 'hidden' in the abstract axiom of associativity and allows an exact representation of the Deuteron magnetic moment.

== Quasi-Lie algebra ==
A quasi-Lie algebra in abstract algebra is just like a Lie algebra, but with the usual axiom

$$[x,x]=0$$

replaced by

$[x,y]=-[y,x]$ (anti-symmetry).

In characteristic other than 2, these are equivalent (in the presence of bilinearity), so this distinction doesn't arise when considering real or complex Lie algebras. It can however become important, when considering Lie algebras over the integers.

In a quasi-Lie algebra,

$$2[x,x]=0.$$

Therefore, the bracket of any element with itself is 2-torsion, if it does not actually vanish.

See also: Whitehead product.

== See also ==
- Hypoalgebra
