= N-group (category theory) =

In mathematics, an n-group, or n-dimensional higher group, is a special kind of n-category that generalises the concept of group to higher-dimensional algebra. Here, $n$ may be any natural number or infinity. The thesis of Alexander Grothendieck's student Hoàng Xuân Sính was an in-depth study of 2-groups under the moniker 'gr-category'.

The general definition of $n$-group is a matter of ongoing research. However, it is expected that every topological space will have a homotopy $n$-group at every point, which will encapsulate the Postnikov tower of the space up to the homotopy group $\pi_n$, or the entire Postnikov tower for $n=\infty$.

== Examples ==
=== Eilenberg-MacLane spaces ===
One of the principal examples of higher groups come from the homotopy types of Eilenberg–MacLane spaces $K(A,n)$ since they are the fundamental building blocks for constructing higher groups, and homotopy types in general. For instance, every group $G$ can be turned into an Eilenberg-MacLane space $K(G,1)$ through a simplicial construction, and it behaves functorially. This construction gives an equivalence between groups and 1-groups. Note that some authors write $K(G,1)$ as $BG$, and for an abelian group $A$, $K(A,n)$ is written as $B^nA$.

=== 2-groups ===
The definition and many properties of 2-groups are already known. 2-groups can be described using crossed modules and their classifying spaces. Essentially, these are given by a quadruple $(\pi_1,\pi_2, t,\omega)$ where $\pi_1,\pi_2$ are groups with $\pi_2$ abelian,

$$t:\pi_1 \to \operatorname{Aut} \pi_2$$

a group homomorphism, and $\omega \in H^3(B\pi_1,\pi_2)$ a cohomology class. These groups can be encoded as homotopy $2$-types $X$ with $\pi_1 X = \pi_1$ and $\pi_2 X = \pi_2$, with the action coming from the action of $\pi_1 X$ on higher homotopy groups, and $\omega$ coming from the Postnikov tower since there is a fibration

$$B^2\pi_2 \to X \to B\pi_1$$

coming from a map $B\pi_1 \to B^3\pi_2$. Note that this idea can be used to construct other higher groups with group data having trivial middle groups $\pi_1, e, \ldots, e, \pi_n$, where the fibration sequence is now

$$B^n\pi_n \to X \to B\pi_1$$

coming from a map $B\pi_1 \to B^{n+1}\pi_n$ whose homotopy class is an element of $H^{n+1}(B\pi_1, \pi_n)$.

=== 3-groups ===
Another interesting and accessible class of examples which requires homotopy theoretic methods, not accessible to strict groupoids, comes from looking at homotopy 3-types of groups. Essentially, these are given by a triple of groups $(\pi_1,\pi_2,\pi_3)$ with only the first group being non-abelian, and some additional homotopy theoretic data from the Postnikov tower. If we take this 3-group as a homotopy 3-type $X$, the existence of universal covers gives us a homotopy type $\hat{X} \to X$ which fits into a fibration sequence

$$\hat{X} \to X \to B\pi_1$$

giving a homotopy $\hat{X}$ type with $\pi_1$ trivial on which $\pi_1$ acts on. These can be understood explicitly using the previous model of 2-groups, shifted up by degree (called delooping). Explicitly, $\hat{X}$ fits into a Postnikov tower with associated Serre fibration

$$B^{3}\pi_3 \to \hat{X} \to B^2\pi_2$$

giving where the $B^3\pi_3$-bundle $\hat{X} \to B^2\pi_2$ comes from a map $B^2\pi_2 \to B^4\pi_3$, giving a cohomology class in $H^4(B^2\pi_2, \pi_3)$. Then, $X$ can be reconstructed using a homotopy quotient $\hat{X}//\pi_1 \simeq X$.

=== n-groups ===
The previous construction gives the general idea of how to consider higher groups in general. For an n-group with groups $\pi_1,\pi_2,\ldots,\pi_n$ with the latter bunch being abelian, we can consider the associated homotopy type $X$ and first consider the universal cover $\hat{X} \to X$. Then, this is a space with trivial $\pi_1(\hat{X}) = 0$, making it easier to construct the rest of the homotopy type using the Postnikov tower. Then, the homotopy quotient $\hat{X} // \pi_1$ gives a reconstruction of $X$, showing the data of an $n$-group is a higher group, or simple space, with trivial $\pi_1$ such that a group $G$ acts on it homotopy theoretically. This observation is reflected in the fact that homotopy types are not realized by simplicial groups, but simplicial groupoids^{pg 295} since the groupoid structure models the homotopy quotient $-// \pi_1$.

Going through the construction of a 4-group $X$ is instructive because it gives the general idea for how to construct the groups in general. For simplicity, let's assume $\pi_1 = e$ is trivial, so the non-trivial groups are $\pi_2,\pi_3,\pi_4$. This gives a Postnikov tower

$$X \to X_3 \to B^2\pi_2 \to *$$

where the first non-trivial map $X_3 \to B^2\pi_2$ is a fibration with fiber $B^3\pi_3$. Again, this is classified by a cohomology class in $H^4(B^2\pi_2, \pi_3)$. Now, to construct $X$ from $X_3$, there is an associated fibration

$$B^4\pi_4 \to X \to X_3$$

given by a homotopy class $[X_3, B^5\pi_4] \cong H^5(X_3,\pi_4)$. In principle this cohomology group should be computable using the previous fibration $B^3\pi_3 \to X_3 \to B^2\pi_2$ with the Serre spectral sequence with the correct coefficients, namely $\pi_4$. Doing this recursively, say for a $5$-group, would require several spectral sequence computations, at worst $n!$ many spectral sequence computations for an $n$-group.

==== n-groups from sheaf cohomology ====
For a complex manifold $X$ with universal cover $\pi:\tilde{X}\to X$, and a sheaf of abelian groups $\mathcal{F}$ on $X$, for every $n \geq 0$ there exists canonical homomorphisms

$$\phi_n:H^n(\pi_1 X, H^0(\tilde{X}, \pi^*\mathcal{F})) \to H^n(X, \mathcal{F})$$

giving a technique for relating n-groups constructed from a complex manifold $X$ and sheaf cohomology on $X$. This is particularly applicable for complex tori.

== See also ==
- ∞-groupoid
- Crossed module
- Homotopy hypothesis
- Abelian 2-group
