= Hoàng Xuân Sính =

Vietnamese mathematician (born 1933)

- Born: 8 September 1933 (age 93)
- Education: University of Toulouse
- Known for: First female professor in Vietnam in any scientific or technical field Gr-catégories (2-group)
- Awards: Ordre des Palmes Académiques
- Scientific career
- Fields: Mathematics
- Doctoral advisor: Alexander Grothendieck

Hoàng Xuân Sính (born September 8, 1933) is a Vietnamese mathematician, a student of Grothendieck, the first female mathematics professor in Vietnam, the founder of Thang Long University, and a recipient of the Ordre des Palmes Académiques.

== Early life and career ==
Sính was born in Cót, in the Từ Liêm District of Vietnam, one of seven children of fabric merchant Hoàng Thuc Tan. Her mother died when she was eight years old, and Sính was raised by a stepmother. Sính has also frequently been said to be the granddaughter of Vietnamese mathematician Hoàng Xuân Hãn. She completed a bachelor's degree in 1951 in Hanoi, studying English and French, and then traveled to Paris for a second baccalaureate in mathematics. Sính stayed in France to study for an agrégation at the University of Toulouse, which she completed in 1959, before returning to Vietnam to become a mathematics teacher at the Hanoi National University of Education. Sính became the first female mathematics professor in Vietnam where she was one of a very small number of mathematicians with a foreign education at that time.

== Work with Grothendieck ==
The French mathematician and pacifist Alexander Grothendieck visited North Vietnam in late 1967, during the Vietnam War, and spent a month teaching mathematics to the Hanoi University mathematics department staff, including Sính, who took the notes for the lectures. Because of the war, Grothendieck's lectures were held away from Hanoi, first in the nearby countryside and later in Đại Từ. After Grothendieck returned to France, he continued to teach Sính as a correspondence student. She earned her doctorate under Grothendieck's supervision from Paris Diderot University in 1975, with a handwritten thesis. Her thesis research, on algebraic structures based on categorical groups but with a group law that holds only up to isomorphism, prefigured much of the modern theory of 2-groups.

== Later accomplishments ==
When she was promoted to full professor Hoàng became the first female full professor in Vietnam in any scientific or technical field. In 1988 she founded the first private university in Vietnam, Thang Long University in Hanoi, and became the president of its board of directors.

== Recognition ==
In 2003 she was awarded France's Ordre des Palmes Académiques for her "contributions to boosting cooperation in culture and science between the two nations" of France and Vietnam.
