= Whitehead product =

Homotopy operation

In mathematics, the Whitehead product is a graded quasi-Lie algebra structure on the homotopy groups of a space. It was defined by J. H. C. Whitehead in (Whitehead 1941).

The relevant MSC code is: 55Q15, Whitehead products and generalizations.

== Definition ==
Given elements $f \in \pi_k(X), g \in \pi_l(X)$, the Whitehead bracket

$$[f,g] \in \pi_{k+l-1}(X)$$

is defined as follows:

The product $S^k \times S^l$ can be obtained by attaching a $(k+l)$-cell to the wedge sum

$$S^k \vee S^l$$;

the attaching map is a map

$$S^{k+l-1} \stackrel{\phi}{\ \longrightarrow\ } S^k \vee S^l.$$

Represent $f$ and $g$ by maps

$$f\colon S^k \to X$$

and

$$g\colon S^l \to X,$$

then compose their wedge with the attaching map, as

$$S^{k+l-1} \stackrel{\phi}{\ \longrightarrow\ } S^k \vee S^l \stackrel{f \vee g}{\ \longrightarrow\ } X .$$

The homotopy class of the resulting map does not depend on the choices of representatives, and thus one obtains a well-defined element of

$$\pi_{k+l-1}(X).$$

== Grading ==
Note that there is a shift of 1 in the grading (compared to the indexing of homotopy groups), so $\pi_k(X)$ has degree $(k-1)$; equivalently, $L_k = \pi_{k+1}(X)$ (setting L to be the graded quasi-Lie algebra). Thus $L_0 = \pi_1(X)$ acts on each graded component.

== Properties ==
The Whitehead product satisfies the following properties:

- Bilinearity. $[f,g+h] = [f,g] + [f,h], [f+g,h] = [f,h] + [g,h]$
- Graded Symmetry. $[f,g]=(-1)^{pq}[g,f], f \in \pi_p X, g \in \pi_q X, p,q \geq 2$
- Graded Jacobi identity. $(-1)^{pr}[[f,g],h] + (-1)^{pq}[[g,h],f] + (-1)^{rq}[[h,f],g] = 0, f \in \pi_p X, g \in \pi_q X, h \in \pi_r X \text{ with } p,q,r \geq 2$

Sometimes the homotopy groups of a space, together with the Whitehead product operation are called a graded quasi-Lie algebra; this is proven in Uehara & Massey (1957) via the Massey triple product.

=== Relation to the action of $\pi_{1}$ ===
If $f \in \pi_1(X)$, then the Whitehead bracket is related to the usual action of $\pi_1$ on $\pi_k$ by

$$[f,g]=g^f-g,$$

where $g^f$ denotes the conjugation of $g$ by $f$.

For $k=1$, this reduces to

$$[f,g]=fgf^{-1}g^{-1},$$

which is the usual commutator in $\pi_1(X)$. This can also be seen by observing that the $2$-cell of the torus $S^{1} \times S^{1}$ is attached along the commutator in the $1$-skeleton $S^{1} \vee S^{1}$.

=== Whitehead products on H-spaces ===
For a path connected H-space, all the Whitehead products on $\pi_{*}(X)$ vanish. By the previous subsection, this is a generalization of both the facts that the fundamental groups of H-spaces are abelian, and that H-spaces are simple.

=== Suspension ===
All Whitehead products of classes $\alpha \in \pi_{i}(X)$, $\beta \in \pi_{j}(X)$ lie in the kernel of the suspension homomorphism $\Sigma \colon \pi_{i+j-1}(X) \to \pi_{i+j}(\Sigma X)$

== Examples ==
- $[\mathrm{id}_{S^{2}} , \mathrm{id}_{S^{2}}] = 2 \cdot \eta \in \pi_3(S^{2})$, where $\eta \colon S^{3} \to S^{2}$ is the Hopf map.

This can be shown by observing that the Hopf invariant defines an isomorphism $\pi_{3}(S^{2}) \cong \Z$ and explicitly calculating the cohomology ring of the cofibre of a map representing $[\mathrm{id}_{S^{2}}, \mathrm{id}_{S^{2}}]$. Using the Pontryagin–Thom construction there is a direct geometric argument, using the fact that the preimage of a regular point is a copy of the Hopf link.

== See also ==
- Generalised Whitehead product
- Massey product
- Toda bracket
