= Paratopological group =

In mathematics, a paratopological group is a topological semigroup that is algebraically a group. In other words, it is a group G with a topology such that the group's product operation is a continuous function from G × G to G. This differs from the definition of a topological group in that the group inverse is not required to be continuous.

As with topological groups, some authors require the topology to be Hausdorff.

Compact paratopological groups are automatically topological groups.
