= Simple space =

In algebraic topology, a branch of mathematics, a simple space is a connected topological space that has a homotopy type of a CW complex and whose fundamental group is abelian and acts trivially on the homotopy and homology of the universal covering space, though not all authors include the assumption on the homotopy type.

== Examples ==
=== Topological groups ===
For example, any topological group is a simple space (provided it satisfies the condition on the homotopy type).

=== Eilenberg-Maclane spaces ===
Most Eilenberg-Maclane spaces $K(A,n)$ are simple since the only nontrivial homotopy group is in degree $n$. This means the only non-simple spaces are $K(G,1)$ for $G$ nonabelian.

=== Universal covers ===
Every connected topological space $X$ has an associated (universal) simple space from the universal cover $\pi:U_X \to X$; indeed, $\pi_1(U_X) = *$ and the universal cover is its own universal cover.
