= Twisted K-theory =

Mathematical theory

In mathematics, twisted K-theory (also called K-theory with local coefficients) is a variation on K-theory, a mathematical theory from the 1950s that spans algebraic topology, abstract algebra and operator theory.

More specifically, twisted K-theory with twist H is a particular variant of K-theory, in which the twist is given by an integral 3-dimensional cohomology class. It is special among the various twists that K-theory admits for two reasons. First, it admits a geometric formulation. This was provided in two steps; the first one was done in 1970 (Publ. Math. de l'IHÉS) by Peter Donovan and Max Karoubi; the second one in 1988 by Jonathan Rosenberg in Continuous-Trace Algebras from the Bundle Theoretic Point of View.

In physics, it has been conjectured to classify D-branes, Ramond-Ramond field strengths and in some cases even spinors in type II string theory. For more information on twisted K-theory in string theory, see K-theory (physics).

In the broader context of K-theory, in each subject it has numerous isomorphic formulations and, in many cases, isomorphisms relating definitions in various subjects have been proven. It also has numerous deformations, for example, in abstract algebra K-theory may be twisted by any integral cohomology class.

== Definition ==
To motivate Rosenberg's geometric formulation of twisted K-theory, start from the Atiyah–Jänich theorem, stating that

$$Fred(\mathcal H),$$

the Fredholm operators on Hilbert space $\mathcal H$, is a classifying space for ordinary, untwisted K-theory. This means that the K-theory of the space $M$ consists of the homotopy classes of maps

$$[M\rightarrow Fred(\mathcal H)]$$

from $M$ to $Fred(\mathcal H).$

A slightly more complicated way of saying the same thing is as follows. Consider the trivial bundle of $Fred(\mathcal H)$ over $M$, that is, the Cartesian product of $M$ and $Fred(\mathcal H)$. Then the K-theory of $M$ consists of the homotopy classes of sections of this bundle.

We can make this yet more complicated by introducing a trivial

$$PU(\mathcal H)$$

bundle $P$ over $M$, where $PU(\mathcal H)$ is the group of projective unitary operators on the Hilbert space $\mathcal H$. Then the group of maps

$$[P\rightarrow Fred(\mathcal H)]_{PU(\mathcal H)}$$

from $P$ to $Fred(\mathcal H)$ which are equivariant under an action of $PU(\mathcal H)$ is equivalent to the original groups of maps

$$[M\rightarrow Fred(\mathcal H)].$$

This more complicated construction of ordinary K-theory is naturally generalized to the twisted case. To see this, note that $PU(\mathcal H)$ bundles on $M$ are classified by elements $H$ of the third integral cohomology group of $M$. This is a consequence of the fact that $BPU(\mathcal H)$ topologically is a representative Eilenberg–MacLane space

$$K(\mathbf Z,3)$$.

The generalization is then straightforward. Rosenberg has defined

$$K_H(M)$$,

the twisted K-theory of $M$ with twist given by the 3-class $H$, to be the space of homotopy classes of sections of the trivial $Fred(\mathcal H)$ bundle over $M$ that are covariant with respect to a $PU(\mathcal H)$ bundle $P_H$ fibered over $M$ with 3-class $H$, that is

$$K_H(M)=[P_H\rightarrow Fred(\mathcal H)]_{PU(\mathcal H)}.$$

Equivalently, it is the space of homotopy classes of sections of the $Fred(\mathcal H)$ bundles associated to a $PU(\mathcal H)$ bundle with class $H$.

== Relation to K-theory ==
When $H$ is the trivial class, twisted K-theory is just untwisted K-theory, which is a ring. However, when $H$ is nontrivial this theory is no longer a ring. It has an addition, but it is no longer closed under multiplication.

However, the direct sum of the twisted K-theories of $M$ with all possible twists is a ring. In particular, the product of an element of K-theory with twist $H$ with an element of K-theory with twist $H'$ is an element of K-theory twisted by $H+H'$. This element can be constructed directly from the above definition by using adjoints of Fredholm operators and construct a specific 2 x 2 matrix out of them (see the reference 1, where a more natural and general Z/2-graded version is also presented). In particular twisted K-theory is a module over classical K-theory.

== Calculations ==
Physicist typically want to calculate twisted K-theory using the Atiyah–Hirzebruch spectral sequence. The idea is that one begins with all of the even or all of the odd integral cohomology, depending on whether one wishes to calculate the twisted $K_0$ or the twisted $K^0$, and then one takes the cohomology with respect to a series of differential operators. The first operator, $d_3$, for example, is the sum of the three-class $H$, which in string theory corresponds to the Neveu-Schwarz 3-form, and the third Steenrod square, so

$d_3^{p,q} = Sq^3 + H$

No elementary form for the next operator, $d_5$, has been found, although several conjectured forms exist. Higher operators do not contribute to the $K$-theory of a 10-manifold, which is the dimension of interest in critical superstring theory. Over the rationals Michael Atiyah and Graeme Segal have shown that all of the differentials reduce to Massey products of $M$.

After taking the cohomology with respect to the full series of differentials one obtains twisted $K$-theory as a set, but to obtain the full group structure one in general needs to solve an extension problem.

=== Example: the three-sphere ===
The three-sphere, $S^3$, has trivial cohomology except for $H^0(S^3)$ and $H^3(S^3)$ which are both isomorphic to the integers. Thus the even and odd cohomologies are both isomorphic to the integers. Because the three-sphere is of dimension three, which is less than five, the third Steenrod square is trivial on its cohomology and so the first nontrivial differential is just $d_3 = H$. The later differentials increase the degree of a cohomology class by more than three and so are again trivial; thus the twisted $K$-theory is just the cohomology of the operator $d_3$ which acts on a class by cupping it with the 3-class $H$.

Imagine that $H$ is the trivial class, zero. Then $d_3$ is also trivial. Thus its entire domain is its kernel, and nothing is in its image. Thus $K^0_H(S^3)$ is the kernel of $d_3$ in the even cohomology, which is the full even cohomology, which consists of the integers. Similarly $K^1_H(S^3)$ consists of the odd cohomology quotiented by the image of $d_3$, in other words quotiented by the trivial group. This leaves the original odd cohomology, which is again the integers. In conclusion, $K^0$ and $K^1$ of the three-sphere with trivial twist are both isomorphic to the integers. As expected, this agrees with the untwisted $K$-theory.

Now consider the case in which $H$ is nontrivial. $H$ is defined to be an element of the third integral cohomology, which is isomorphic to the integers. Thus $H$ corresponds to a number, which we will call $n$. $d_3$ now takes an element $m$ of $H^0$ and yields the element $nm$ of $H^3$. As $n$ is not equal to zero by assumption, the only element of the kernel of $d_3$ is the zero element, and so $K_{H=n}^0(S^3)=0$. The image of $d_3$ consists of all elements of the integers that are multiples of $n$. Therefore, the odd cohomology, $\mathbb{Z}$, quotiented by the image of $d_3$, $n\mathbb{Z}$, is the cyclic group of order $n$, $\mathbb{Z}/n$. In conclusion

$K^1_{H=n}(S^3) = \mathbb{Z}/n$

In string theory this result reproduces the classification of D-branes on the 3-sphere with $n$ units of $H$-flux, which corresponds to the set of symmetric boundary conditions in the supersymmetric $SU(2)$ WZW model at level $n-2$.

There is an extension of this calculation to the group manifold of SU(3). In this case the Steenrod square term in $d_3$, the operator $d_5$, and the extension problem are nontrivial.

== See also ==
- K-theory (physics)
- Wess–Zumino–Witten model
- Bundle gerbe
