= Semitopological group =

In mathematics, a semitopological group is a topological space with a group operation that is continuous with respect to each variable considered separately. It is a weakening of the concept of a topological group; all topological groups are semitopological groups but the converse does not hold.

== Formal definition ==
A semitopological group $G$ is a topological space that is also a group such that

$$g_1: G \times G \to G : (x,y)\mapsto xy$$

is continuous with respect to both $x$ and $y$. (Note that a topological group is continuous with reference to both variables simultaneously, and $g_2: G\to G : x \mapsto x^{-1}$ is also required to be continuous. Here $G \times G$ is viewed as a topological space with the product topology.)

Clearly, every topological group is a semitopological group. To see that the converse does not hold, consider the real line $(\mathbb{R},+)$ with its usual structure as an additive abelian group. Apply the lower limit topology to $\mathbb{R}$ with topological basis the family $\{[a,b):-\infty < a < b < \infty \}$. Then $g_1$ is continuous, but $g_2$ is not continuous at 0: $[0,b)$ is an open neighbourhood of 0 but there is no neighbourhood of 0 contained in $g_2^{-1}([0,b))$.

It is known that any locally compact Hausdorff semitopological group is a topological group. Other similar results are also known.

== See also ==
- Lie group
- Algebraic group
- Compact group
- Topological ring
