= Comodule over a Hopf algebroid =

In mathematics, at the intersection of algebraic topology and algebraic geometry, there is the notion of a Hopf algebroid which encodes the information of a presheaf of groupoids whose object sheaf and arrow sheaf are represented by algebras. Because any such presheaf will have an associated site, we can consider quasi-coherent sheaves on the site, giving a topos-theoretic notion of modules. Dually^{pg 2}, comodules over a Hopf algebroid are the purely algebraic analogue of this construction, giving a purely algebraic description of quasi-coherent sheaves on a stack: this is one of the first motivations behind the theory.

== Definition ==
Given a commutative Hopf-algebroid $(A,\Gamma)$ a left comodule $M$^{pg 302} is a left $A$-module $M$ together with an $A$-linear map

$\psi: M \to \Gamma\otimes_AM$

which satisfies the following two properties

1. (counitary) $(\varepsilon\otimes Id_M)\circ \psi = Id_M$
2. (coassociative) $(\Delta\otimes Id_M) \circ \psi = (Id_\Gamma \otimes \psi) \circ \psi$

A right comodule is defined similarly, but instead there is a map

$\phi: M \to M \otimes_A \Gamma$

satisfying analogous axioms.

== Structure theorems ==
=== Flatness of Γ gives an abelian category ===
One of the main structure theorems for comodules^{pg 303} is if $\Gamma$ is a flat $A$-module, then the category of comodules $\text{Comod}(A,\Gamma)$ of the Hopf-algebroid is an abelian category.

=== Relation to stacks ===
There is a structure theorem ^{pg 7} relating comodules of Hopf-algebroids and modules of presheaves of groupoids. If $(A,\Gamma)$ is a Hopf-algebroid, there is an equivalence between the category of comodules $\text{Comod}(A,\Gamma)$ and the category of quasi-coherent sheaves $\text{QCoh}(\text{Spec}(A),\text{Spec}(\Gamma))$ for the associated presheaf of groupoids

$\text{Spec}(\Gamma)\rightrightarrows \text{Spec}(A)$

to this Hopf-algebroid.

== Examples ==
=== From BP-homology ===
Associated to the Brown-Peterson spectrum is the Hopf-algebroid $(BP_*,BP_*(BP))$ classifying p-typical formal group laws. Note

$$\begin{align}
BP_* &= \mathbb{Z}_{(p)}[v_1,v_2,\ldots] \\
BP_*(BP) &= BP_*[t_1,t_2,\ldots]
\end{align}$$

where $\mathbb{Z}_{(p)}$ is the localization of $\mathbb{Z}$ by the prime ideal $(p)$. If we let $I_n$ denote the ideal

$I_n = (p,v_1,\ldots, v_{n-1})$

Since $v_n$ is a primitive in $BP_*/I_n$, there is an associated Hopf-algebroid $(A,\Gamma)$

$(v_n^{-1}BP_*/I_n, v_n^{-1}BP_*(BP)/I_n)$

There is a structure theorem on the Adams-Novikov spectral sequence relating the Ext-groups of comodules on $(BP_*,BP_*(BP))$ to Johnson-Wilson homology, giving a more tractable spectral sequence. This happens through an equivalence of categories of comodules of $(A,\Gamma)$ to the category of comodules of

$(v_n^{-1}E(m)_*/I_n, v_n^{-1}E(m)_*(E(m)/I_n)$

giving the isomorphism

$\text{Ext}^{*,*}_{BP_*BP}(M,N) \cong \text{Ext}^{*,*}_{E(m)_*E(m)}(E(m)_*\otimes_{BP_*} M,E(m)_*\otimes_{BP_*}N)$

assuming $M$ and $N$ satisfy some technical hypotheses ^{pg 24}.

== See also ==
- Adams spectral sequence
- Steenrod algebra
