= Bundle gerbe =

In mathematics, a bundle gerbe is a geometrical model of certain 1-gerbes with connection, or equivalently of a 2-class in Deligne cohomology.

== Topology ==
$U(1)$-principal bundles over a space $M$ (see circle bundle) are geometrical realizations of 1-classes in Deligne cohomology which consist of 1-form connections and 2-form curvatures. The topology of a $U(1)$ bundle is classified by its Chern class, which is an element of $H^2(M, \mathbb{Z})$, the second integral cohomology of $M$.

Gerbes, or more precisely 1-gerbes, are abstract descriptions of Deligne 2-classes, which each define an element of $H^3(M, \mathbb{Z})$, the third integral cohomology of M.

=== As a cohomology class in Deligne cohomology ===
Recall for a smooth manifold $M$ the p-th Deligne cohomology groups are defined by the hypercohomology of the complex
$$\mathbb{Z}(q)_D^\infty = \underline{\mathbb{Z}}(q) \to \mathcal{A}_{M,\mathbb{C}}^0 \xrightarrow{d}
\mathcal{A}_{M,\mathbb{C}}^1 \xrightarrow{d} \cdots \xrightarrow{d} \mathcal{A}_{M,\mathbb{C}}^{q-1}$$
called the weight q Deligne complex, where $\mathcal{A}^k_{M,\mathbb{C}}$ is the sheaf of germs of smooth differential k-forms tensored with $\mathbb{C}$. So, we write
$$\mathbb{H}^*_D(M,\mathbb{Z}(q)^{\infty}_D)$$
for the Deligne-cohomology groups of weight $q$. In the case $q = 3$ the Deligne complex is then
$$\underline{\mathbb{Z}}(3) \to \mathcal{A}^0_{M,\mathbb{C}} \xrightarrow{d} \mathcal{A}^1_{M,\mathbb{C}} \xrightarrow{d}
\mathcal{A}^2_{M,\mathbb{C}}$$
We can understand the Deligne cohomology groups by looking at the Čech resolution giving a double complex. There is also an associated short exact sequence
$$0 \to \frac{\mathcal{A}_{\mathbb{C},M}^{2}(M)_{cl}}{\mathcal{A}_{\mathbb{C},M}^{2}(M)_{cl,0}}
\to \mathbb{H}^3(M, \mathbb{Z}(3)_D^\infty) \to H^3(M,\mathbb{Z}) \to 0$$
where $\mathcal{A}_{\mathbb{C},M}^{2}(M)_{cl}$ are the closed germs of complex valued 2-forms on $M$ and $\mathcal{A}_{\mathbb{C},M}^{2}(M)_{cl,0}$ is the subspace of such forms where period integrals are integral. This can be used to show $H^3(M,\mathbb{Z})$ are the isomorphism classes of $\mathbb{C}^*$ bundle-gerbes on a smooth manifold $M$, or equivalently, the isomorphism classes of $B\mathbb{C}^*$-bundles on $M$.

== History ==
Historically the most popular construction of a gerbe is a category-theoretic model featured in Giraud's theory of gerbes, which are roughly sheaves of groupoids over M.

In 1994 Murray introduced bundle gerbes, which are geometric realizations of 1-gerbes. For many purposes these are more suitable for calculations than Giraud's realization, because their construction is entirely within the framework of classical geometry. In fact, as their name suggests, they are fiber bundles.

This notion was extended to higher gerbes the following year.

== Relationship with twisted K-theory ==
In Twisted K-theory and the K-theory of Bundle Gerbes the authors defined modules of bundle gerbes and used this to define a K-theory for bundle gerbes. They then showed that this K-theory is isomorphic to Rosenberg's twisted K-theory, and provides an analysis-free construction.

In addition they defined a notion of twisted Chern character which is a characteristic class for an element of twisted K-theory. The twisted Chern character is a differential form that represents a class in the twisted cohomology with respect to the nilpotent operator
$$d + H$$
where $d$ is the ordinary exterior derivative and the twist $H$ is a closed 3-form. This construction was extended to equivariant K-theory and to holomorphic K-theory by Mathai and Stevenson.

== Relationship with field theory ==
Bundle gerbes have also appeared in the context of conformal field theories. Gawedzki and Reis have interpreted the Wess–Zumino term in the Wess–Zumino–Witten model (WZW) of string propagation on a group manifold as the connection of a bundle gerbe. Urs Schreiber, Christoph Schweigert and Konrad Waldorf have used this construction to extend WZW models to unoriented surfaces and, more generally, the global Kalb–Ramond coupling to unoriented strings.

More details can be found at the n-Category Café:

- Bundle Gerbes: General Idea and Definition
- Bundle Gerbes: Connections and Surface Transport

== See also ==
- Gerbe
- Orbifold
