= Hypoalgebra =

In algebra, a hypoalgebra is a generalization of a subalgebra of a Lie algebra introduced by Patera, Sharp & Slansky (1980). The relation between an algebra and a hypoalgebra is called a subjoining (Patera & Sharp 1980), which generalizes the notion of an inclusion of subalgebras. There is also a notion of restriction of a representation of a Lie algebra to a subjoined hypoalgebra, with branching rules similar to those for restriction to subalgebras except that some of the multiplicities in the branching rule may be negative. W. G. McKay, J. Patera, and D. W. Rand (1990) calculated many of these branching rules for hypoalgebras.
