= Đại Từ =

- Đại Từ fields at the foot of the Tam Đảo Mountains

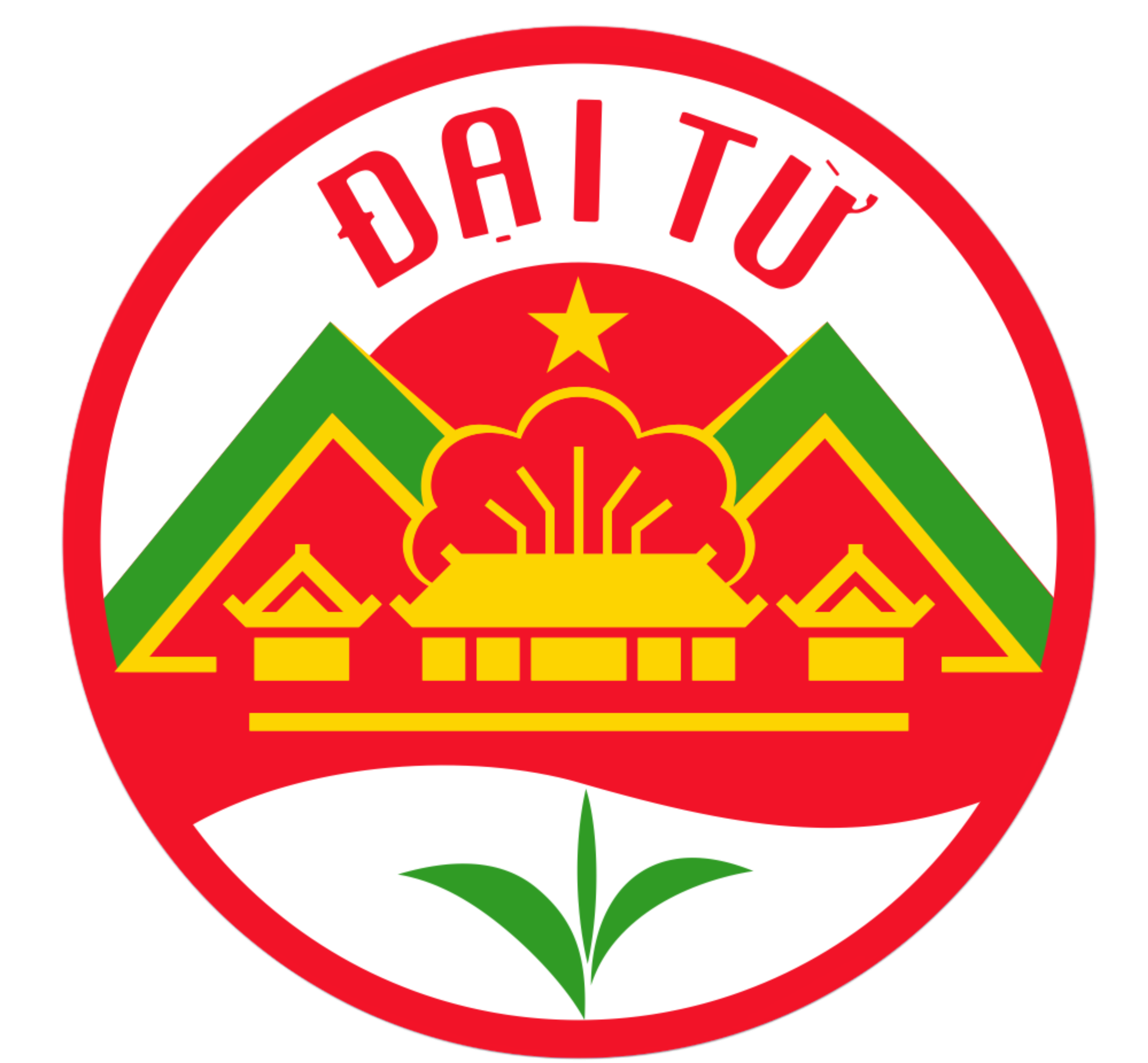
- Emblem
- Interactive map of Đại Từ
- Coordinates: 21.619677003646267°N 105.64001203967581°E
- Country: Vietnam
- Province: Thái Nguyên
- Region: Northeast
- Established: 2025

Area
  - Total: 69.42 km^{2} (26.80 sq mi)

Population (2025)
  - Total: 27,021
  - Density: 389/km^{2} (1,010/sq mi)
- Website: daitu.thainguyen.gov.vn

Đại Từ is a commune in the southwestern part of Thái Nguyên, Vietnam.

== Geography ==
Đại Từ Commune has the following geographical boundaries:

- To the east, it borders Đại Phúc Commune across Núi Cốc Lake.
- To the west, it borders La Bằng Commune and Phú Thọ.
- To the south, it borders Vạn Phú Commune and Phú Thọ.
- To the north, it borders La Bằng Commune and Đại Phúc Commune.

Đại Từ Commune has an area of 69.42 km² and a population of 27,021 in 2025. The area is planned for urban development, trade and services, and industry associated with the development of logistics hubs and commercial centers. The commune's transportation infrastructure includes National Route 37, Provincial Roads 261 and 263B, as well as district and inter-commune roads. Several small streams originate in the Tam Đảo Mountains to the west and flow into Núi Cốc Lake.

Đại Từ Commune has several lakes and ponds, including Suối Diễu Lake (5.31 ha), Đoàn Uỷ Lake (18.80 ha), Đồng Phiêng Lake (2.42 ha), and Hà Thuận Pond (2.34 ha).

== History ==
In June 2025, Đại Từ Commune was established by merging the entire natural area and population of Bình Thuận, Khôi Kỳ, Mỹ Yên, and Lục Ba communes of Đại Từ District.
