= Moore space (algebraic topology) =

In algebraic topology, a branch of mathematics, Moore space is the name given to a particular type of topological space that is the homology analogue of the Eilenberg–Maclane spaces of homotopy theory, in the sense that it has only one nonzero homology (rather than homotopy) group.

The study of Moore spaces was initiated by John Coleman Moore in 1954.

== Formal definition ==
Given an abelian group G and an integer n ≥ 1, let X be a CW complex such that

$$H_n(X) \cong G$$

and

$$\tilde{H}_i(X) \cong 0$$

for i ≠ n, where $H_n(X)$ denotes the n-th singular homology group of X and $\tilde{H}_i(X)$ is the i-th reduced homology group. Then X is said to be a Moore space. It's also sensible to require (as Moore did) that X be simply-connected if n>1.

== Examples ==
- $S^n$ is a Moore space of $\mathbb{Z}$ for $n\geq 1$.
- $\mathbb{RP}^2$ is a Moore space of $\mathbb{Z}/2\mathbb{Z}$ for $n=1$.

== See also ==
- Eilenberg–MacLane space, the homotopy analog.
- Homology sphere
