= Postnikov system =

In mathematics, a topological construction

In homotopy theory, a branch of algebraic topology, a Postnikov system (or Postnikov tower) is a way of decomposing a topological space by filtering its homotopy type. For a space $X$, this is a list of spaces $\{X_n\}_{n \geq 0}$ where

$$\pi_k(X_n) = \begin{cases}
\pi_k(X) & \text{ for } k \leq n \\
0 & \text{ for } k > n
\end{cases}$$

and a series of maps $\phi_n: X_n \to X_{n-1}$ that are fibrations with Eilenberg-MacLane spaces $K(\pi_n(X),n)$ as fibers. In short, we are decomposing the homotopy type of $X$ using an inverse system of topological spaces whose homotopy type at degree $k$ agrees with the truncated homotopy type of the original space $X$. Postnikov systems were introduced by, and are named after, Mikhail Postnikov.

There is a similar construction called the Whitehead tower (defined below) where instead of having spaces $X_n$ with the homotopy type of $X$ for degrees $\leq n$, these spaces have null homotopy groups $\pi_{k}(X_n) =0$ for $1 < k < n$.

== Definition ==
A Postnikov system of a path-connected space $X$ is an inverse system of spaces

$$\cdots \to X_n \xrightarrow{p_n} X_{n-1}\xrightarrow{p_{n-1}} \cdots \xrightarrow{p_3} X_2 \xrightarrow{p_2} X_1 \xrightarrow{p_1} *$$

with a sequence of maps $\phi_n : X \to X_n$ compatible with the inverse system such that

1. The map $\phi_n : X \to X_n$ induces an isomorphism $\pi_i(X) \to \pi_i(X_n)$ for every $i\leq n$.
2. $\pi_i(X_n) = 0$ for $i > n$.
3. Each map $p_n : X_n \to X_{n-1}$ is a fibration, and so the fiber $F_n$ is an Eilenberg–MacLane space, $K(\pi_n(X),n)$.

The first two conditions imply that $X_1$ is also a $K(\pi_1(X),1)$-space. More generally, if $X$ is $(n-1)$-connected, then $X_n$ is a $K(\pi_n(X),n)$-space and all $X_{i}$ for $i < n$ are contractible. Note the third condition is only included optionally by some authors.

=== Existence ===
Postnikov systems exist on connected CW complexes, and there is a weak homotopy-equivalence between $X$ and its inverse limit, so

$$X\simeq\varprojlim{}X_n$$,

showing that $X$ is a CW approximation of its inverse limit. They can be constructed on a CW complex by iteratively killing off homotopy groups. If we have a map $f : S^{n} \to X$ representing a homotopy class $[f]\in\pi_n(X)$, we can take the pushout along the boundary map $S^{n} \to e_{n+1}$, killing off the homotopy class. For $X_{m}$ this process can be repeated for all $n > m$, giving a space which has vanishing homotopy groups $\pi_n(X_m)$. Using the fact that $X_{n-1}$can be constructed from $X_n$ by killing off all homotopy maps $S^n \to X_{n}$, we obtain a map $X_n \to X_{n-1}$.

=== Main property ===
One of the main properties of the Postnikov tower, which makes it so powerful to study while computing cohomology, is the fact the spaces $X_n$ are homotopic to a CW complex $\mathfrak{X}_n$ which differs from $X$ only by cells of dimension $\geq n+2$.

=== Homotopy classification of fibrations ===
The sequence of fibrations $p_n:X_n \to X_{n-1}$ have homotopically defined invariants, meaning the homotopy classes of maps $p_n$, give a well defined homotopy type $[X] \in \operatorname{Ob}(hTop)$. The homotopy class of $p_n$ comes from looking at the homotopy class of the classifying map for the fiber $K(\pi_n(X), n)$. The associated classifying map is

$$X_{n-1} \to B(K(\pi_n(X),n)) \simeq K(\pi_n(X),n+1)$$,

hence the homotopy class $[p_n]$ is classified by a homotopy class

$$[p_n] \in [X_{n-1},K(\pi_n(X), n+1)] \cong H^{n+1}(X_{n-1}, \pi_n(X))$$

called the nth Postnikov invariant of $X$, since the homotopy classes of maps to Eilenberg-Maclane spaces gives cohomology with coefficients in the associated abelian group.

==== Fiber sequence for spaces with two nontrivial homotopy groups ====
One of the special cases of the homotopy classification is the homotopy class of spaces $X$ such that there exists a fibration

$$K(A,n) \to X \to \pi_1(X)$$

giving a homotopy type with two non-trivial homotopy groups, $\pi_1(X) = G$, and $\pi_n(X) = A$. Then, from the previous discussion, the fibration map $BG \to K(A,n+1)$ gives a cohomology class in

$$H^{n+1}(BG, A)$$,

which can also be interpreted as a group cohomology class. This space $X$ can be considered a higher local system.

== Examples of Postnikov towers ==
=== Postnikov tower of a K(G, n) ===
One of the conceptually simplest cases of a Postnikov tower is that of the Eilenberg–Maclane space $K(G,n)$. This gives a tower with

$$\begin{matrix}
X_i \simeq * &\text{for } i < n \\
X_i \simeq K(G,n) & \text{for } i \geq n
\end{matrix}$$

=== Postnikov tower of S^{2} ===
The Postnikov tower for the sphere $S^2$ is a special case whose first few terms can be understood explicitly. Since we have the first few homotopy groups from the simply connectedness of $S^2$, degree theory of spheres, and the Hopf fibration, giving $\pi_k(S^2) \simeq \pi_k(S^3)$ for $k \geq 3$, hence

$$\begin{matrix}
\pi_1(S^2) =& 0 \\
\pi_2(S^2) =& \Z \\
\pi_3(S^2) =& \Z \\
\pi_4(S^2) =& \Z/2.
\end{matrix}$$

Then, $X_2 = S^2_2 = K(\Z,2)$, and $X_3$ comes from a pullback sequence

$$\begin{matrix}
X_3 & \to & * \\
\downarrow & & \downarrow \\
X_2 & \to & K(\Z,4) ,
\end{matrix}$$

which is an element in

$$[p_3] \in [K(\Z,2), K(\Z,4)] \cong H^4(\mathbb{CP}^\infty) = \Z$$.

If this was trivial it would imply $X_3 \simeq K(\Z,2)\times K(\Z,3)$. But, this is not the case! In fact, this is responsible for why strict infinity groupoids don't model homotopy types. Computing this invariant requires more work, but can be explicitly found. This is the quadratic form $x \mapsto x^2$ on $\Z \to \Z$ coming from the Hopf fibration $S^3 \to S^2$. Note that each element in $H^4(\mathbb{CP}^\infty)$ gives a different homotopy 3-type.

== Homotopy groups of spheres ==
One application of the Postnikov tower is the computation of homotopy groups of spheres. For an $n$-dimensional sphere $S^n$ we can use the Hurewicz theorem to show each $S^n_i$ is contractible for $i < n$, since the theorem implies that the lower homotopy groups are trivial. Recall there is a spectral sequence for any Serre fibration, such as the fibration

$$K(\pi_{n+1}(X), n + 1) \simeq F_{n+1} \to S^n_{n+1} \to S^n_n \simeq K(\Z, n)$$.

We can then form a homological spectral sequence with $E^2$-terms

$$E^2_{p,q} = H_p\left(K(\Z, n), H_q\left(K\left(\pi_{n+1}\left(S^n\right), n + 1\right)\right)\right)$$.

And the first non-trivial map to $\pi_{n+1}\left(S^n\right)$,

$$d^{n+1}_{0,n+1} : H_{n+2}(K(\Z, n)) \to H_0\left(K(\Z, n), H_{n+1}\left(K\left(\pi_{n+1}\left(S^n\right), n + 1\right)\right)\right)$$,

equivalently written as

$$d^{n+1}_{0,n+1} : H_{n+2}(K(\Z, n)) \to \pi_{n+1}\left(S^n\right)$$.

If it's easy to compute $H_{n+1}\left(S^n_{n+1}\right)$ and $H_{n+2}\left(S^n_{n+2}\right)$, then we can get information about what this map looks like. In particular, if it's an isomorphism, we obtain a computation of $\pi_{n+1}\left(S^n\right)$. For the case $n = 3$, this can be computed explicitly using the path fibration for $K(\Z, 3)$, the main property of the Postnikov tower for $\mathfrak{X}_4 \simeq S^3 \cup \{\text{cells of dimension} \geq 6\}$ (giving $H_4(X_4) = H_5(X_4) = 0$, and the universal coefficient theorem giving $\pi_4\left(S^3\right) = \Z/2$. Moreover, because of the Freudenthal suspension theorem this actually gives the stable homotopy group $\pi_1^\mathbb{S}$ since $\pi_{n+k}\left(S^n\right)$ is stable for $n \geq k + 2$.

Note that similar techniques can be applied using the Whitehead tower (below) for computing $\pi_4\left(S^3\right)$ and $\pi_5\left(S^3\right)$, giving the first two non-trivial stable homotopy groups of spheres.

== Postnikov towers of spectra ==
In addition to the classical Postnikov tower, there is a notion of Postnikov towers in stable homotopy theory constructed on spectra^{pg 85-86}.

=== Definition ===
For a spectrum $E$ a postnikov tower of $E$ is a diagram in the homotopy category of spectra, $\text{Ho}(\textbf{Spectra})$, given by

$$\cdots \to E_{(2)} \xrightarrow{p_2} E_{(1)} \xrightarrow{p_1} E_{(0)}$$,

with maps

$$\tau_n : E \to  E_{(n)}$$

commuting with the $p_n$ maps. Then, this tower is a Postnikov tower if the following two conditions are satisfied:

1. $\pi_i^{\mathbb{S}}\left(E_{(n)}\right) = 0$ for $i > n$,
2. $\left(\tau_n\right)_* : \pi_i^{\mathbb{S}}(E) \to \pi_i^{\mathbb{S}}\left(E_{(n)}\right)$ is an isomorphism for $i \leq n$,

where $\pi_i^{\mathbb{S}}$ are stable homotopy groups of a spectrum. It turns out every spectrum has a Postnikov tower and this tower can be constructed using a similar kind of inductive procedure as the one given above.

== Whitehead tower ==
Given a CW complex $X$, there is a dual construction to the Postnikov tower called the Whitehead tower. Instead of killing off all higher homotopy groups, the Whitehead tower iteratively kills off lower homotopy groups. This is given by a tower of CW complexes,

$$\cdots \to X_3 \to X_2 \to X_1 \to X$$,

where

1. The lower homotopy groups are zero, so $\pi_i(X_n) = 0$ for $i \leq n$.
2. The induced map $\pi_i : \pi_i(X_n) \to \pi_i(X)$ is an isomorphism for $i > n$.
3. The maps $X_n \to X_{n-1}$ are fibrations with fiber $K(\pi_n(X), n-1)$.

=== Implications ===
Notice $X_1 \to X$ is the universal cover of $X$ since it is a covering space with a simply connected cover. Furthermore, each $X_n \to X$ is the universal $n$-connected cover of $X$.

=== Construction ===
The spaces $X_n$ in the Whitehead tower are constructed inductively. If we construct a $K\left(\pi_{n+1}(X), n + 1\right)$ by killing off the higher homotopy groups in $X_n$, we get an embedding $X_n \to K(\pi_{n+1}(X), n + 1)$. If we let

$$X_{n+1} = \left\{f\colon I \to K\left(\pi_{n+1}(X), n + 1\right) : f(0) = p \text{ and } f(1) \in X_{n} \right\}$$

for some fixed basepoint $p$, then the induced map $X_{n+1} \to X_n$ is a fiber bundle with fiber homeomorphic to

$$\Omega K\left(\pi_{n+1}(X), n + 1\right) \simeq K\left(\pi_{n+1}(X), n\right)$$,

and so we have a Serre fibration

$$K\left(\pi_{n+1}(X), n\right) \to X_n \to X_{n-1}$$.

Using the long exact sequence in homotopy theory, we have that $\pi_i(X_n) = \pi_i\left(X_{n-1}\right)$ for $i \geq n + 1$, $\pi_i(X_n) = \pi_i(X_{n-1}) = 0$ for $i < n-1$, and finally, there is an exact sequence

$$0 \to \pi_{n+1}\left(X_{n+1}) \to \pi_{n+1}(X_{n}\right) \mathrel{\overset{\partial}{\rightarrow}} \pi_{n}K\left(\pi_{n+1}(X), n\right) \to \pi_{n}\left(X_{n+1}\right) \to 0$$,

where if the middle morphism is an isomorphism, the other two groups are zero. This can be checked by looking at the inclusion $X_n \to K(\pi_{n+1}(X), n + 1)$ and noting that the Eilenberg–Maclane space has a cellular decomposition

$X_{n-1} \cup \{\text{cells of dimension} \geq n + 2\}$; thus,
$$\pi_{n+1}\left(X_n\right) \cong \pi_{n+1}\left(K\left(\pi_{n+1}(X), n + 1\right)\right) \cong \pi_n\left(K\left(\pi_{n+1}(X), n\right)\right)$$,

giving the desired result.

=== As a homotopy fiber ===
Another way to view the components in the Whitehead tower is as a homotopy fiber. If we take

$$\text{Hofiber}(\phi_n: X \to X_n)$$

from the Postnikov tower, we get a space $X^n$ which has

$$\pi_k(X^n) = \begin{cases}
\pi_k(X) & k > n \\
0 & k \leq n
\end{cases}$$

== Whitehead tower of spectra ==
The dual notion of the Whitehead tower can be defined in a similar manner using homotopy fibers in the category of spectra. If we let

$$E\langle n \rangle = \operatorname{Hofiber}\left(\tau_n: E \to E_{(n)}\right)$$

then this can be organized in a tower giving connected covers of a spectrum. This is a widely used construction in bordism theory because the coverings of the unoriented cobordism spectrum $M\text{O}$ gives other bordism theories

$$\begin{align}
M\text{String} &= M\text{O}\langle 8 \rangle \\
M\text{Spin} &= M\text{O}\langle 4 \rangle \\
M\text{SO} &= M\text{O}\langle 2 \rangle
\end{align}$$

such as string bordism.

== Whitehead tower and string theory ==
In Spin geometry the $\operatorname{Spin}(n)$ group is constructed as the universal cover of the Special orthogonal group $\operatorname{SO}(n)$, so $\Z/2 \to \operatorname{Spin}(n) \to SO(n)$ is a fibration, giving the first term in the Whitehead tower. There are physically relevant interpretations for the higher parts in this tower, which can be read as

$\cdots \to \operatorname{Fivebrane}(n) \to \operatorname{String}(n) \to \operatorname{Spin}(n) \to \operatorname{SO}(n)$

where $\operatorname{String}(n)$ is the $3$-connected cover of $\operatorname{SO}(n)$ called the string group, and $\operatorname{Fivebrane}(n)$ is the $7$-connected cover called the fivebrane group.

== See also ==
- Adams spectral sequence
- Eilenberg–MacLane space
- CW complex
- Obstruction theory
- Stable homotopy theory
- Homotopy groups of spheres
- Higher group
- Hopf–Whitney theorem, application to calculate homotopy classes
