= Topological group =

Group that is a topological space with continuous group operations

The real numbers form a topological group under addition

In mathematics, topological groups are groups and topological spaces at the same time, where the group operations are required to be continuous. This connects these two structures together, relating them to each other.

Topological groups were studied extensively in the period of 1925 to 1940. Haar and Weil (respectively in 1933 and 1940) showed that the integrals and Fourier series are special cases of a construction that can be defined on a very wide class of topological groups.

Topological groups, along with continuous group actions, are used to study continuous symmetries, which have many applications, for example, in physics. In functional analysis, every topological vector space is an additive topological group with the additional property that scalar multiplication is continuous; consequently, many results from the theory of topological groups can be applied to functional analysis.

== Formal definition ==
A topological group, G, is a topological space that is also a group such that the group operation (in this case product):

$$\cdot : G \times G \to G, (x,y) \mapsto xy$$

and the inversion map:

$$^{-1} : G \to G, x \mapsto x^{-1}$$

are continuous. (Note: i.e. Continuous means that for any open set $U \subseteq G$, $f^{-1}(U)$ is open in the domain $dom f$ of f.) Here $G \times G$ is viewed as a topological space with the product topology. Such a topology is said to be compatible with the group operations and is called a group topology.

Checking continuity

The product map is continuous if and only if for any $x, y \in G$ and any neighborhood W of $xy$ in G, there exist neighborhoods U of x and V of y in G such that $U \cdot V \subseteq W$, where $U \cdot V := \{ u \cdot v : u \in U, v \in V \}$. The inversion map is continuous if and only if for any $x \in G$ and any neighborhood V of $x^{-1}$ in G, there exists a neighborhood U of x in G such that $U^{-1} \subseteq V$ where $U^{-1} := \{ u^{-1} : u \in U \}$

To show that a topology is compatible with the group operations, it suffices to check that the map

$$G \times G \to G, (x,y) \mapsto xy^{-1}$$

is continuous. Explicitly, this means that for any $x, y \in G$ and any neighborhood W in G of $xy^{-1}$, there exist neighborhoods U of x and V of y in G such that $U \cdot (V^{-1}) \subseteq W$.

Additive notation

This definition used notation for multiplicative groups; the equivalent for additive groups would be that the following two operations are continuous:

$$+ : G \times G \to G, (x,y) \mapsto x + y$$
$$- : G \to G, x \mapsto -x$$

Hausdorffness

Although not part of this definition, many authors require that the topology on G be Hausdorff. One reason for this is that any topological group can be canonically associated with a Hausdorff topological group by taking an appropriate quotient; this, however, often still requires working with the original non-Hausdorff topological group. Other reasons, and some equivalent conditions, are discussed below.

This article will not assume that topological groups are necessarily Hausdorff.

Categorical definition of topological group

In the language of category theory, topological groups can be defined concisely as group objects in the category of topological spaces, in the same way that ordinary groups are group objects in the category of sets. Note that the axioms are given in terms of the maps (binary product, unary inverse, and nullary identity), hence are categorical definitions.

=== Homomorphisms ===
A homomorphism of topological groups is defined to be a continuous group homomorphism $G \to H$. Topological groups, together with their homomorphisms, form a category. A group homomorphism between topological groups is continuous if and only if it is continuous at some point.

An isomorphism of topological groups is a group isomorphism that is also a homeomorphism of the underlying topological spaces. This is stronger than simply requiring a continuous group isomorphism—the inverse must also be continuous. There are examples of topological groups that are isomorphic as ordinary groups but not as topological groups.

For example, let G be any group. We can put at least two topologies on it: the discrete topology or the indiscrete topology, both of which make the group operations continuous. Denoting the group with the discrete topology as $(G, \mathcal T_1)$, and the group with the indiscrete topology as $(G, \mathcal T_2)$, the identity map $I:(G, \mathcal T_1)\to(G, \mathcal T_2)$ defined by $I(g)=g$ is a continuous group isomorphism, but it is not an isomorphism of topological groups (if $G$ is not the trivial group).

== Examples ==
Every group can be trivially made into a topological group by considering it with the discrete topology; such groups are called discrete groups. In this sense, the theory of topological groups subsumes that of ordinary groups. The indiscrete topology (i.e. the trivial topology) also makes every group into a topological group.

The group of real numbers $\mathbb{R}$ with the usual topology forms a topological group under addition. Euclidean n-space $\mathbb{R}^{n}$ is also a topological group under addition, and more generally, every topological vector space forms an (abelian) topological group. Some other examples of abelian topological groups are the circle group $S^{1}$, or the torus $(S^{1})^{n}$ for any natural number n.

The classical groups are important examples of non-abelian topological groups. For instance, the general linear group $\text{GL}(n,\mathbb{R})$ of all invertible n-by-n matrices with real entries can be viewed as a topological group with the topology defined by viewing $\text{GL}(n,\mathbb{R})$ as a subspace of Euclidean space $\mathbb{R}^{n \times n}$. Another classical group is the orthogonal group $\text{O}(n)$, the group of all linear maps from $\mathbb{R}^{n}$ to itself that preserve the length of all vectors. The orthogonal group is compact as a topological space. Much of Euclidean geometry can be viewed as studying the structure of the orthogonal group, or the closely related group $\text{O}(n) \ltimes \mathbb{R}^{n}$ of isometries of $\mathbb{R}^{n}$.

The groups mentioned so far are all Lie groups, meaning that they are smooth manifolds in such a way that the group operations are smooth, not just continuous. Lie groups are the best-understood topological groups; many questions about Lie groups can be converted to purely algebraic questions about Lie algebras and then solved.

An example of a topological group that is not a Lie group is the additive group $\mathbb{Q}$ of rational numbers, with the topology inherited from $\mathbb{R}$. This is a countable space, and it does not have the discrete topology. An important example for number theory is the group $\mathbb{Z}_{p}$ of p-adic integers, for a prime number p, meaning the inverse limit of the finite groups $\mathbb{Z} / p^{n}$ as n goes to infinity. The group $\mathbb{Z}_{p}$ is well behaved in that it is compact (in fact, homeomorphic to the Cantor set), but it differs from (real) Lie groups in that it is totally disconnected. More generally, there is a theory of p-adic Lie groups, including compact groups such as $\text{GL}(n,\mathbb{Z}_{p})$ as well as locally compact groups such as $\text{GL}(n,\mathbb{Q}_{p})$ , where $\mathbb{Q}_{p}$ the locally compact field of p-adic numbers.

The group $\mathbb{Z}_{p}$ is a profinite group; it is isomorphic to a subgroup of the product $\prod_{n \geq 1} \mathbb{Z} / p^{n}$ in such a way that its topology is induced by the product topology, where the finite groups $\mathbb{Z} / p^{n}$ are given the discrete topology. Another large class of profinite groups important in number theory is the class of absolute Galois groups.

Some topological groups can be viewed as infinite dimensional Lie groups; this phrase is best understood informally, to include several different families of examples. For example, a topological vector space, such as a Banach space or Hilbert space, is an abelian topological group under addition. Some other infinite-dimensional groups that have been studied, with varying degrees of success, are loop groups, Kac–Moody groups, Diffeomorphism groups, homeomorphism groups, and gauge groups.

In every Banach algebra with multiplicative identity, the set of invertible elements forms a topological group under multiplication. For example, the group of invertible bounded operators on a Hilbert space arises this way.

== Properties ==
=== Translation invariance ===
Every topological group's topology is translation invariant, which by definition means that if for any $a \in G,$ left or right multiplication by this element yields a homeomorphism $G \to G.$ This makes every topological group into a homogeneous space. Consequently, for any $a \in G$ and $S \subseteq G,$ the subset $S$ is open (resp. closed) in $G$ if and only if this is true of its left translation $a S := \{a s : s \in S\}$ and right translation $S a := \{s a : s \in S\}.$ If $\mathcal{N}$ is a neighborhood basis of the identity element in a topological group $G$ then for all $x \in X,$ $x \mathcal{N} := \{x N : N \in \mathcal{N}\}$ is a neighborhood basis of $x$ in $G.$ In particular, any group topology on a topological group is completely determined by any neighborhood basis at the identity element. If $S$ is any subset of $G$ and $U$ is an open subset of $G,$ then $S U := \{s u : s \in S, u \in U\}$ is an open subset of $G.$

=== Symmetric neighborhoods ===
The inversion operation $g \mapsto g^{-1}$ on a topological group $G$ is a homeomorphism from $G$ to itself.

A subset $S \subseteq G$ is said to be symmetric if $S^{-1} = S,$ where $S^{-1} := \left\{s^{-1} : s \in S\right\}.$ If E is any subset of a topological group G, then the sets E^{−1} ∩ E, E^{−1} ∪ E, and E^{−1} E are symmetric. For abelian G, the closure of every symmetric set is symmetric.

For any neighborhood N in a commutative topological group G of the identity element, there exists a symmetric neighborhood M of the identity element such that M^{−1} M ⊆ N, where note that M^{−1} M is necessarily a symmetric neighborhood of the identity element. Thus every topological group has a neighborhood basis at the identity element consisting of symmetric sets.

If G is a locally compact commutative group, then for any neighborhood N in G of the identity element, there exists a symmetric relatively compact neighborhood M of the identity element such that cl M ⊆ N (where cl M is symmetric as well).

=== Uniform space ===
Every topological group can be viewed as a uniform space in two ways; the left uniformity turns all left multiplications into uniformly continuous maps while the right uniformity turns all right multiplications into uniformly continuous maps. If G is not abelian, then these two need not coincide. The uniform structures allow one to talk about notions such as completeness, uniform continuity and uniform convergence on topological groups.

=== Separation properties ===
If U is an open subset of a commutative topological group G and U contains a compact set K, then there exists a neighborhood N of the identity element such that KN ⊆ U.

As a uniform space, every commutative topological group is completely regular. Consequently, for a multiplicative topological group G with identity element 1, the following are equivalent:

1. G is a T_{0}-space (Kolmogorov);
2. G is a T_{2}-space (Hausdorff);
3. G is a T_{3 1/2} (Tychonoff);
4. { 1 } is closed in G;
5. { 1 } := N, where 𝒩 is a neighborhood basis of the identity element in G;
6. for any $x \in G$ such that $x \neq 1,$ there exists a neighborhood U in G of the identity element such that $x \not\in U.$

A subgroup of a commutative topological group is discrete if and only if it has an isolated point.

If G is not Hausdorff, then one can obtain a Hausdorff group by passing to the quotient group G/K, where K is the closure of the identity. This is equivalent to taking the Kolmogorov quotient of G.

=== Metrisability ===
Let $G$ be a topological group. As with any topological space, we say that $G$ is metrisable if and only if there exists a metric $d$ on $G$, which induces the same topology on $G$. A metric $d$ on $G$ is called

- left-invariant (resp. right-invariant) if and only if $d(ax_{1},ax_{2})=d(x_{1},x_{2})$(resp. $d(x_{1}a,x_{2}a)=d(x_{1},x_{2})$) for all $a,x_{1},x_{2}\in G$ (equivalently, $d$ is left-invariant just in case the map $x \mapsto ax$ is an isometry from $(G,d)$ to itself for each $a \in G$).
- proper if and only if all open balls, $B(r)=\{g \in G \mid d(g,\mathbf 1)<r\}$ for $r>0$, are pre-compact.

The Birkhoff–Kakutani theorem (named after mathematicians Garrett Birkhoff and Shizuo Kakutani) states that the following three conditions on a topological group $G$ are equivalent:

1. $G$ is (Hausdorff and) first countable (equivalently: the identity element $\mathbf 1$ is closed in $G$, and there is a countable basis of neighborhoods for $\mathbf 1$ in $G$).
2. $G$ is metrisable (as a topological space).
3. There is a left-invariant metric on $G$ that induces the given topology on $G$.
4. There is a right-invariant metric on $G$ that induces the given topology on $G$.

Furthermore, the following are equivalent for any topological group $G$:

1. $G$ is a second countable locally compact (Hausdorff) space.
2. $G$ is a Polish, locally compact (Hausdorff) space.
3. $G$ is properly metrisable (as a topological space).
4. There is a left-invariant, proper metric on $G$ that induces the given topology on $G$.

Note: As with the rest of the article we of assume here a Hausdorff topology. The implications 4 $\Rightarrow$ 3 $\Rightarrow$ 2 $\Rightarrow$ 1 hold in any topological space. In particular 3 $\Rightarrow$ 2 holds, since in particular any properly metrisable space is a countable union of compact metrisable, and thus separable (cf. properties of compact metric spaces), subsets. The non-trivial implication 1 $\Rightarrow$ 4 was first proved by Raimond Struble in 1974. An alternative approach was made by Uffe Haagerup and Agata Przybyszewska in 2006, the idea of the which is as follows: One relies on the construction of a left-invariant metric, $d_{0}$, as in the case of first countable spaces. By local compactness, closed balls of sufficiently small radii are compact, and by normalising we can assume this holds for radius $1$. Closing the open ball, $U$, of radius $1$ under multiplication yields a clopen subgroup, $H$, of $G$, on which the metric $d_{0}$ is proper. Since $H$ is open and $G$ is second countable, the subgroup has at most countably many cosets. One now uses this sequence of cosets and the metric on $H$ to construct a proper metric on $G$.

=== Subgroups ===
Every subgroup of a topological group is itself a topological group when given the subspace topology. Every open subgroup H is also closed in G, since the complement of H is the open set given by the union of the cosets gH for g ∈ G \ H, which are open. If H is a subgroup of G, then the closure of H is also a subgroup. Likewise, if H is a normal subgroup of G, the closure of H is normal in G.

=== Quotients and normal subgroups ===
If H is a subgroup of G, the set of left cosets G/H with the quotient topology is called a homogeneous space for G. The quotient map $q : G \to G / H$ is always open. For example, for a positive integer n, the sphere S^{n} is a homogeneous space for the rotation group SO(n+1) in $\R^{n+1}$, with S^{n} = SO(n+1)/SO(n). A homogeneous space G/H is Hausdorff if and only if H is closed in G. Partly for this reason, it is natural to concentrate on closed subgroups when studying topological groups.

If H is a normal subgroup of G, then the quotient group G/H becomes a topological group when given the quotient topology. It is Hausdorff if and only if H is closed in G. For example, the quotient group $\R / \Z$ is isomorphic to the circle group S^{1}.

In any topological group, the identity component (i.e., the connected component containing the identity element) is a closed normal subgroup. If C is the identity component and a is any point of G, then the left coset aC is the component of G containing a. So the collection of all left cosets (or right cosets) of C in G is equal to the collection of all components of G. It follows that the quotient group G/C is totally disconnected.

=== Closure and compactness ===
In any commutative topological group, the product (assuming the group is multiplicative) KC of a compact set K and a closed set C is a closed set. Furthermore, for any subsets R and S of G, (cl R)(cl S) ⊆ cl (RS).

If H is a subgroup of a commutative topological group G and if N is a neighborhood in G of the identity element such that H ∩ cl N is closed, then H is closed. Every discrete subgroup of a Hausdorff commutative topological group is closed.

=== Isomorphism theorems ===
The isomorphism theorems from ordinary group theory are not always true in the topological setting. This is because a bijective homomorphism need not be an isomorphism of topological groups.

For example, a native version of the first isomorphism theorem is false for topological groups: if $f:G\to H$ is a morphism of topological groups (that is, a continuous homomorphism), it is not necessarily true that the induced homomorphism $\tilde {f}:G/\ker f\to \mathrm{Im}(f)$ is an isomorphism of topological groups; it will be a bijective, continuous homomorphism, but it will not necessarily be a homeomorphism. In other words, it will not necessarily admit an inverse in the category of topological groups. For example, consider the identity map from the set of real numbers equipped with the discrete topology to the set of real numbers equipped with the Euclidean topology. This is a group homomorphism, and it is continuous because any function out of a discrete space is continuous, but it is not an isomorphism of topological groups because its inverse is not continuous.

There is a version of the first isomorphism theorem for topological groups, which may be stated as follows: if $f : G \to H$ is a continuous homomorphism, then the induced homomorphism from G/ker(f) to im(f) is an isomorphism if and only if the map f is open onto its image.

The third isomorphism theorem, however, is true more or less verbatim for topological groups, as one may easily check.

== Hilbert's fifth problem ==
There are several strong results on the relation between topological groups and Lie groups. First, every continuous homomorphism of Lie groups $G \to H$ is smooth. It follows that a topological group has a unique structure of a Lie group if one exists. Also, Cartan's theorem says that every closed subgroup of a Lie group is a Lie subgroup, in particular a smooth submanifold.

Hilbert's fifth problem asked whether a topological group G that is a topological manifold must be a Lie group. In other words, does G have the structure of a smooth manifold, making the group operations smooth? As shown by Andrew Gleason, Deane Montgomery, and Leo Zippin, the answer to this problem is yes. In fact, G has a real analytic structure. Using the smooth structure, one can define the Lie algebra of G, an object of linear algebra that determines a connected group G up to covering spaces. As a result, the solution to Hilbert's fifth problem reduces the classification of topological groups that are topological manifolds to an algebraic problem, albeit a complicated problem in general.

The theorem also has consequences for broader classes of topological groups. First, every compact group (understood to be Hausdorff) is an inverse limit of compact Lie groups. (One important case is an inverse limit of finite groups, called a profinite group. For example, the group $\mathbb{Z}_{p}$ of p-adic integers and the absolute Galois group of a field are profinite groups.) Furthermore, every connected locally compact group is an inverse limit of connected Lie groups. At the other extreme, a totally disconnected locally compact group always contains a compact open subgroup, which is necessarily a profinite group. (For example, the locally compact group $\text{GL}(n,\mathbb{Q}_{p})$ contains the compact open subgroup $\text{GL}(n,\mathbb{Z}_{p})$, which is the inverse limit of the finite groups $\text{GL}(n,\mathbb{Z} / p^{r})$ as r' goes to infinity.)

== Representations of compact or locally compact groups ==
An action of a topological group G on a topological space X is a group action of G on X such that the corresponding function $G \times X \to X$ is continuous. Likewise, a representation of a topological group G on a real or complex topological vector space V is a continuous action of G on V such that for each $g \in G$, the map $v \mapsto gv$ from V to itself is linear.

Group actions and representation theory are particularly well understood for compact groups, generalizing what happens for finite groups. For example, every finite-dimensional (real or complex) representation of a compact group is a direct sum of irreducible representations. An infinite-dimensional unitary representation of a compact group can be decomposed as a Hilbert-space direct sum of irreducible representations, which are all finite-dimensional; this is part of the Peter–Weyl theorem. For example, the theory of Fourier series describes the decomposition of the unitary representation of the circle group $S^{1}$ on the complex Hilbert space $\text{L}^{2}(S^{1})$. The irreducible representations of $S^{1}$ are all 1-dimensional, of the form $z \mapsto z^{n}$ for integers n (where $S^{1}$ is viewed as a subgroup of the multiplicative group $\mathbb{C}\ast$). Each of these representations occurs with multiplicity 1 in $\text{L}^{2}(S^{1})$.

The irreducible representations of all compact connected Lie groups have been classified. In particular, the character of each irreducible representation is given by the Weyl character formula.

More generally, locally compact groups have a rich theory of harmonic analysis, because they admit a natural notion of measure and integral, given by the Haar measure. Every unitary representation of a locally compact group can be described as a direct integral of irreducible unitary representations. (The decomposition is essentially unique if G is of Type I, which includes the most important examples such as abelian groups and semisimple Lie groups.) A basic example is the Fourier transform, which decomposes the action of the additive group $\mathbb{R}$ on the Hilbert space $\text{L}^{2}(\mathbb{R})$ as a direct integral of the irreducible unitary representations of $\mathbb{R}$. The irreducible unitary representations of $\mathbb{R}$ are all 1-dimensional, of the form $x \mapsto e^{2 \pi i a x}$ for $a \in \mathbb{R}$.

The irreducible unitary representations of a locally compact group may be infinite-dimensional. A major goal of representation theory, related to the Langlands classification of admissible representations, is to find the unitary dual (the space of all irreducible unitary representations) for the semisimple Lie groups. The unitary dual is known in many cases, such as for the special linear group of degree 2 over the real numbers $\text{SL}(2,\mathbb{R})$, but not all.

For a locally compact abelian group G, every irreducible unitary representation has dimension 1. In this case, the unitary dual $\hat{G}$ is a group, in fact another locally compact abelian group. Pontryagin duality states that for a locally compact abelian group G, the dual of $\hat{G}$ is the original group G. For example, the dual group of the integers $\mathbb{Z}$ is the circle group $S^{1}$, while the group $\mathbb{R}$ of real numbers is isomorphic to its own dual.

Every locally compact group G has a good supply of irreducible unitary representations; for example, enough representations to distinguish the points of G (the Gelfand–Raikov theorem). By contrast, representation theory for topological groups that are not locally compact has so far been developed only in special situations, and it may not be reasonable to expect a general theory. For example, there are many abelian Banach–Lie groups for which every representation on Hilbert space is trivial.

== Homotopy theory of topological groups ==
Topological groups are special among all topological spaces, even in terms of their homotopy type. One basic point is that a topological group G determines a path-connected topological space, the classifying space $BG$ (which classifies principal G-bundles over topological spaces, under mild hypotheses). The group G is isomorphic in the homotopy category to the loop space of $BG$; that implies various restrictions on the homotopy type of G. Some of these restrictions hold in the broader context of H-spaces.

For example, the fundamental group of a topological group G is abelian. (More generally, the Whitehead product on the homotopy groups of G is zero.) Also, for any field k, the cohomology ring $H^{\ast}(G,k)$ has the structure of a Hopf algebra. In view of structure theorems on Hopf algebras by Heinz Hopf and Armand Borel, this puts strong restrictions on the possible cohomology rings of topological groups. In particular, if G is a path-connected topological group whose rational cohomology ring $H^{\ast}(G,\mathbb{Q})$ is finite-dimensional in each degree, then this ring must be a free graded-commutative algebra over $\mathbb{Q}$, that is, the tensor product of a polynomial ring on generators of even degree with an exterior algebra on generators of odd degree.

In particular, for a connected Lie group G, the rational cohomology ring of G is an exterior algebra on generators of odd degree. Moreover, a connected Lie group G has a maximal compact subgroup K, which is unique up to conjugation, and the inclusion of K into G is a homotopy equivalence. So describing the homotopy types of Lie groups reduces to the case of compact Lie groups. For example, the maximal compact subgroup of $\text{SL}(2,\mathbb{R})$ is the circle group $\text{SO}(2)$, and the homogeneous space $\text{SL}(2,\mathbb{R}) / \text{SO}(2)$ can be identified with the hyperbolic plane. Since the hyperbolic plane is contractible, the inclusion of the circle group into $\text{SL}(2,\mathbb{R})$ is a homotopy equivalence.

Finally, compact connected Lie groups have been classified by Wilhelm Killing, Élie Cartan, and Hermann Weyl. As a result, there is an essentially complete description of the possible homotopy types of Lie groups. For example, a compact connected Lie group of dimension at most 3 is either a torus, the group SU(2) (diffeomorphic to the 3-sphere $S^{3}$), or its quotient group SU(2)/{±1} ≅ SO(3) (diffeomorphic to RP^{3}).

== Complete topological group ==
Information about convergence of nets and filters, such as definitions and properties, can be found in the article about filters in topology.

=== Canonical uniformity on a commutative topological group ===
This article will henceforth assume that any topological group that we consider is an additive commutative topological group with identity element $0.$

The diagonal of $X$ is the set
$$\Delta_X := \{(x, x) : x \in X\}$$
and for any $N \subseteq X$ containing $0,$ the canonical entourage or canonical vicinities around $N$ is the set
$$\Delta_X(N) := \{(x, y) \in X \times X : x - y \in N\} = \bigcup_{y \in X} [(y + N) \times \{y\}] = \Delta_X + (N \times \{0\})$$

For a topological group $(X, \tau),$ the canonical uniformity on $X$ is the uniform structure induced by the set of all canonical entourages $\Delta(N)$ as $N$ ranges over all neighborhoods of $0$ in $X.$

That is, it is the upward closure of the following prefilter on $X \times X,$
$$\left\{\Delta(N) : N \text{ is a neighborhood of } 0 \text{ in } X\right\}$$
where this prefilter forms what is known as a base of entourages of the canonical uniformity.

For a commutative additive group $X,$ a fundamental system of entourages $\mathcal{B}$ is called a translation-invariant uniformity if for every $B \in \mathcal{B},$ $(x, y) \in B$ if and only if $(x + z, y + z) \in B$ for all $x, y, z \in X.$ A uniformity $\mathcal{B}$ is called translation-invariant if it has a base of entourages that is translation-invariant.

- The canonical uniformity on any commutative topological group is translation-invariant.
- The same canonical uniformity would result by using a neighborhood basis of the origin rather the filter of all neighborhoods of the origin.
- Every entourage $\Delta_X(N)$ contains the diagonal $\Delta_X := \Delta_X(\{0\}) = \{(x, x) : x \in X\}$ because $0 \in N.$
- If $N$ is symmetric (that is, $-N = N$) then $\Delta_X(N)$ is symmetric (meaning that $\Delta_X(N)^{\operatorname{op}} = \Delta_X(N)$) and $\Delta_X(N) \circ \Delta_X(N) = \{(x, z) : \text{ there exists } y \in X \text{ such that } x, z \in y + N\} = \bigcup_{y \in X} [(y + N) \times (y + N)] = \Delta_X + (N \times N).$
- The topology induced on $X$ by the canonical uniformity is the same as the topology that $X$ started with (that is, it is $\tau$).

=== Cauchy prefilters and nets ===
The general theory of uniform spaces has its own definition of a "Cauchy prefilter" and "Cauchy net." For the canonical uniformity on $X,$ these reduces down to the definition described below.

Suppose $x_{\bull} = \left(x_i\right)_{i \in I}$ is a net in $X$ and $y_{\bull} = \left(y_j\right)_{j \in J}$ is a net in $Y.$ Make $I \times J$ into a directed set by declaring $(i, j) \leq \left(i_2, j_2\right)$ if and only if $i \leq i_2 \text{ and } j \leq j_2.$ Then $x_{\bull} \times y_{\bull}: = \left(x_i, y_j\right)_{(i, j) \in I \times J}$ denotes the product net. If $X = Y$ then the image of this net under the addition map $X \times X \to X$ denotes the sum of these two nets:
$$x_{\bull} + y_{\bull}: = \left(x_i + y_j\right)_{(i, j) \in I \times J}$$
and similarly their difference is defined to be the image of the product net under the subtraction map:
$$x_{\bull} - y_{\bull}: = \left(x_i - y_j\right)_{(i, j) \in I \times J}.$$

A net $x_{\bull} = \left(x_i\right)_{i \in I}$ in an additive topological group $X$ is called a Cauchy net if
$$\left(x_i - x_j\right)_{(i, j) \in I \times I} \to 0 \text{ in } X$$
or equivalently, if for every neighborhood $N$ of $0$ in $X,$ there exists some $i_0 \in I$ such that $x_i - x_j \in N$ for all indices $i, j \geq i_0.$

A Cauchy sequence is a Cauchy net that is a sequence.

If $B$ is a subset of an additive group $X$ and $N$ is a set containing $0,$ then$B$ is said to be an $N$-small set or small of order $N$ if $B - B \subseteq N.$

A prefilter $\mathcal{B}$ on an additive topological group $X$ called a Cauchy prefilter if it satisfies any of the following equivalent conditions:

1. $\mathcal{B} - \mathcal{B} \to 0$ in $X,$ where $\mathcal{B} - \mathcal{B} := \{B - C : B, C \in \mathcal{B}\}$ is a prefilter.
2. $\{B - B : B \in \mathcal{B}\} \to 0$ in $X,$ where $\{B - B : B \in \mathcal{B}\}$ is a prefilter equivalent to $\mathcal{B} - \mathcal{B}.$
3. For every neighborhood $N$ of $0$ in $X,$ $\mathcal{B}$ contains some $N$-small set (that is, there exists some $B \in \mathcal{B}$ such that $B - B \subseteq N$).

and if $X$ is commutative then also:

4. For every neighborhood $N$ of $0$ in $X,$ there exists some $B \in \mathcal{B}$ and some $x \in X$ such that $B \subseteq x + N.$
- It suffices to check any of the above condition for any given neighborhood basis of $0$ in $X.$

Suppose $\mathcal{B}$ is a prefilter on a commutative topological group $X$ and $x \in X.$ Then $\mathcal{B} \to x$ in $X$ if and only if $x \in \operatorname{cl} \mathcal{B}$ and $\mathcal{B}$ is Cauchy.

=== Complete commutative topological group ===
Recall that for any $S \subseteq X,$ a prefilter $\mathcal{C}$ on $S$ is necessarily a subset of $\wp(S)$; that is, $\mathcal{C} \subseteq \wp(S).$

A subset $S$ of a topological group $X$ is called a complete subset if it satisfies any of the following equivalent conditions:

1. Every Cauchy prefilter $\mathcal{C} \subseteq \wp(S)$ on $S$ converges to at least one point of $S.$
  - If $X$ is Hausdorff then every prefilter on $S$ will converge to at most one point of $X.$ But if $X$ is not Hausdorff then a prefilter may converge to multiple points in $X.$ The same is true for nets.
2. Every Cauchy net in $S$ converges to at least one point of $S$;
3. Every Cauchy filter $\mathcal{C}$ on $S$ converges to at least one point of $S.$
4. $S$ is a complete uniform space (under the point-set topology definition of "complete uniform space") when $S$ is endowed with the uniformity induced on it by the canonical uniformity of $X$;

A subset $S$ is called a sequentially complete subset if every Cauchy sequence in $S$ (or equivalently, every elementary Cauchy filter/prefilter on $S$) converges to at least one point of $S.$

- Importantly, convergence outside of $S$ is allowed: If $X$ is not Hausdorff and if every Cauchy prefilter on $S$ converges to some point of $S,$ then $S$ will be complete even if some or all Cauchy prefilters on $S$ also converge to points(s) in the complement $X \setminus S.$ In short, there is no requirement that these Cauchy prefilters on $S$ converge only to points in $S.$ The same can be said of the convergence of Cauchy nets in $S.$
  - As a consequence, if a commutative topological group $X$ is not Hausdorff, then every subset of the closure of $\{0\},$ say $S \subseteq \operatorname{cl} \{0\},$ is complete (since it is clearly compact and every compact set is necessarily complete). So in particular, if $S \neq \varnothing$ (for example, if $S$ a is singleton set such as $S = \{0\}$) then $S$ would be complete even though every Cauchy net in $S$ (and every Cauchy prefilter on $S$), converges to every point in $\operatorname{cl} \{0\}$ (include those points in $\operatorname{cl} \{0\}$ that are not in $S$).
  - This example also shows that complete subsets (indeed, even compact subsets) of a non-Hausdorff space may fail to be closed (for example, if $\varnothing \neq S \subseteq \operatorname{cl} \{0\}$ then $S$ is closed if and only if $S = \operatorname{cl} \{0\}$).

A commutative topological group $X$ is called a complete group if any of the following equivalent conditions hold:

1. $X$ is complete as a subset of itself.
2. Every Cauchy net in $X$ converges to at least one point of $X.$
3. There exists a neighborhood of $0$ in $X$ that is also a complete subset of $X.$
  - This implies that every locally compact commutative topological group is complete.
4. When endowed with its canonical uniformity, $X$ becomes is a complete uniform space.
  - In the general theory of uniform spaces, a uniform space is called a complete uniform space if each Cauchy filter in $X$ converges in $(X, \tau)$ to some point of $X.$

A topological group is called sequentially complete if it is a sequentially complete subset of itself.

Neighborhood basis: Suppose $C$ is a completion of a commutative topological group $X$ with $X \subseteq C$ and that $\mathcal{N}$ is a neighborhood base of the origin in $X.$ Then the family of sets
$$\left\{ \operatorname{cl}_C N : N \in \mathcal{N} \right\}$$
is a neighborhood basis at the origin in $C.$

Uniform continuity

Let $X$ and $Y$ be topological groups, $D \subseteq X,$ and $f : D \to Y$ be a map. Then $f : D \to Y$ is uniformly continuous if for every neighborhood $U$ of the origin in $X,$ there exists a neighborhood $V$ of the origin in $Y$ such that for all $x, y \in D,$ if $y - x \in U$ then $f(y) - f(x) \in V.$

== Generalizations ==
Various generalizations of topological groups can be obtained by weakening the continuity conditions:

- A semitopological group is a group G with a topology such that for each c ∈ G the two functions G → G defined by x ↦ xc and x ↦ cx are continuous.
- A quasitopological group is a semitopological group in which the function mapping elements to their inverses is also continuous.
- A paratopological group is a group with a topology such that the group operation is continuous.

== See also ==
- Algebraic group – Algebraic variety with a group structure
- Complete field
- Compact group – Topological group with compact topology
- Complete topological vector space – Structure in functional analysis
- Condensed mathematics
- Lie group – Group that is also a differentiable manifold with group operations that are smooth
- Locally compact field
- Locally compact group – Type of topological group in mathematics
- Locally compact quantum group
- Profinite group – Topological group that is in a certain sense assembled from a system of finite groups
- Ordered topological vector space
- Topological abelian group
- Topological field – Algebraic structure with addition, multiplication, and division
- Topological module
- Topological ring
- Topological semigroup
- Topological vector space – Vector space with a notion of nearness
