= Eilenberg–MacLane space =

Topological space with only one nontrivial homotopy group

In mathematics, specifically algebraic topology, an Eilenberg–MacLane space (Note: Saunders Mac Lane originally spelt his name "MacLane" (without a space), and co-published the papers establishing the notion of Eilenberg–MacLane spaces under this name. (See e.g. MR 0013312) In this context it is therefore conventional to write the name without a space.) is a topological space with a single nontrivial homotopy group.

Let G be a group and n a positive integer. A connected topological space X is called an Eilenberg–MacLane space of type $K(G,n)$, if it has n-th homotopy group $\pi_n(X)$ isomorphic to G and all other homotopy groups trivial. Assuming that G is abelian in the case that $n > 1$, Eilenberg–MacLane spaces of type $K(G,n)$ always exist, and are all weak homotopy equivalent. Thus, one may consider $K(G,n)$ as referring to a weak homotopy equivalence class of spaces. It is common to refer to any representative as "a $K(G,n)$" or as "a model of $K(G,n)$". Moreover, it is common to assume that this space is a CW-complex (which is always possible via CW approximation).

The name is derived from Samuel Eilenberg and Saunders Mac Lane, who introduced such spaces in the late 1940s.

As such, an Eilenberg–MacLane space is a special kind of topological space that in homotopy theory can be regarded as a building block for CW-complexes via fibrations in a Postnikov system. These spaces are important in many contexts in algebraic topology, including computations of homotopy groups of spheres, definition of cohomology operations, and for having a strong connection to singular cohomology.

A generalised Eilenberg–MacLane space is a space which has the homotopy type of a product of Eilenberg–MacLane spaces $\prod_{m}K(G_m,m)$.

== Examples ==
- The unit circle $S^1$ is a $K(\Z,1)$.
- The infinite-dimensional complex projective space $\mathbb{CP}^{\infty}$ is a model of $K(\Z,2)$.
- The infinite-dimensional real projective space $\mathbb{RP}^{\infty}$ is a $K(\Z/2\Z,1)$.
- The wedge sum of k unit circles $\textstyle\bigvee_{i=1}^k S^1$ is a $K(F_k,1)$, where $F_k$ is the free group on k generators.
- The complement to any connected knot or graph in a 3-dimensional sphere $S^3$ is of type $K(G,1)$; this is called the "asphericity of knots", and is a 1957 theorem of Christos Papakyriakopoulos.
- Any compact, connected, non-positively curved manifold M is a $K(\Gamma,1)$, where $\Gamma=\pi_1(M)$ is the fundamental group of M. This is a consequence of the Cartan–Hadamard theorem.
- An infinite lens space $L(\infty, q)$ given by the quotient of $S^\infty$ by the free action $(z \mapsto e^{2\pi i m/q}z)$ for $m \in \Z/q$ is a $K(\mathbb{Z}/q,1)$. This can be shown using covering space theory and the fact that the infinite-dimensional sphere is contractible. Note this includes $\mathbb{RP}^{\infty}$ as a $K(\Z/2,1)$.
- The configuration space of $n$ points in the plane is a $K(P_n,1)$, where $P_n$ is the pure braid group on $n$ strands.
- Correspondingly, the nth unordered configuration space of $\mathbb{R}^2$ is a $K(B_n,1)$, where $B_n$ denotes the n-strand braid group.
- The infinite symmetric product $SP(S^n)$ of a n-sphere is a $K(\mathbb{Z},n)$. More generally $SP(M(G,n))$ is a $K(G,n)$ for all Moore spaces $M(G,n)$.

Some further elementary examples can be constructed from these by using the fact that the product $K(G,n) \times K(H,n)$ is $K(G\times H,n)$. For instance the n-dimensional Torus $\mathbb{T}^n$ is a $K(\Z^n, 1)$.

== Constructing Eilenberg–MacLane spaces ==
For $n = 1$ and $G$ an arbitrary group the construction of $K(G,1)$ is identical to that of the classifying space of the group $G$. Note that if G has a torsion element, then every CW-complex of type K(G,1) has to be infinite-dimensional.

There are multiple techniques for constructing higher Eilenberg–MacLane spaces. One of which is to construct a Moore space $M(A,n)$ for an abelian group $A$: Take the wedge of n-spheres, one for each generator of the group A and realise the relations between these generators by attaching (n+1)-cells via corresponding maps in $\pi_n(\bigvee S^n)$ of said wedge sum. Note that the lower homotopy groups $\pi_{i < n} (M(A,n))$ are already trivial by construction. Now iteratively kill all higher homotopy groups $\pi_{i > n} (M(A,n))$ by successively attaching cells of dimension greater than $n + 1$, and define $K(A,n)$ as direct limit under inclusion of this iteration.

Another useful technique is to use the geometric realization of simplicial abelian groups. This gives an explicit presentation of simplicial abelian groups which represent Eilenberg–MacLane spaces.

Another simplicial construction, in terms of classifying spaces and universal bundles, is given in J. Peter May's book.

Since taking the loop space lowers the homotopy groups by one slot, we have a canonical homotopy equivalence $K(G,n)\simeq\Omega K(G,n+1)$, hence there is a fibration sequence

$$K(G,n) \to * \to K(G,n+1)$$.

Note that this is not a cofibration sequence ― the space $K(G,n+1)$ is not the homotopy cofiber of $K(G,n) \to *$.

This fibration sequence can be used to study the cohomology of $K(G,n+1)$ from $K(G,n)$ using the Leray spectral sequence. This was exploited by Jean-Pierre Serre while he studied the homotopy groups of spheres using the Postnikov system and spectral sequences.

== Properties of Eilenberg–MacLane spaces ==
=== Bijection between homotopy classes of maps and cohomology ===
An important property of $K(G, n)$'s is that for any abelian group G, and any based CW-complex X, the set $[X, K(G,n)]$ of based homotopy classes of based maps from X to $K(G,n)$ is in natural bijection with the n-th singular cohomology group $H^n(X, G)$ of the space X. Thus one says that the $K(G,n)s$ are representing spaces for singular cohomology with coefficients in G. Since

$$\begin{array}{rcl}
H^n(K(G,n),G) &=& \operatorname{Hom}(H_n(K(G,n);\Z), G) \\
&=& \operatorname{Hom}(\pi_n(K(G,n)), G) \\
&=& \operatorname{Hom}(G,G),
\end{array}$$

there is a distinguished element $u \in H^n(K(G,n),G)$ corresponding to the identity. The above bijection is given by the pullback of that element $f \mapsto f^*u$. This is similar to the Yoneda lemma of category theory.

A constructive proof of this theorem can be found here, another making use of the relation between omega-spectra and generalized reduced cohomology theories can be found here, and the main idea is sketched later as well.

=== Loop spaces and Omega spectra ===
The loop space of an Eilenberg–MacLane space is again an Eilenberg–MacLane space: $\Omega K(G,n) \cong K(G,n-1)$. Further there is an adjoint relation between the loop-space and the reduced suspension: $[\Sigma X, Y] = [X,\Omega Y]$, which gives $[X,K(G,n)] \cong [X,\Omega^2K(G,n+2)]$ the structure of an abelian group, where the operation is the concatenation of loops. This makes the bijection $[X, K(G,n)] \to H^n(X, G)$ mentioned above a group isomorphism.

Also this property implies that Eilenberg–MacLane spaces with various n form an omega-spectrum, called an "Eilenberg–MacLane spectrum". This spectrum defines via $X \mapsto h^n(X):= [X, K(G,n)]$ a reduced cohomology theory on based CW-complexes and for any reduced cohomology theory $h^*$ on CW-complexes with $h^n(S^0) = 0$ for $n \neq 0$ there is a natural isomorphism $h^n(X) \cong \tilde{H}^n(X, h^0(S^0))$, where $\tilde{H^*}$ denotes reduced singular cohomology. Therefore these two cohomology theories coincide.

In a more general context, Brown representability says that every reduced cohomology theory on based CW-complexes comes from an omega-spectrum.

=== Relation with homology ===
For a fixed abelian group $G$ there are maps on the stable homotopy groups

$$\pi_{q+n}^s(X \wedge K(G,n)) \cong \pi_{q+n+1}^s(X \wedge \Sigma K(G,n)) \to \pi_{q+n+1}^s(X \wedge K(G,n+1))$$

induced by the map $\Sigma K(G,n) \to K(G,n+1)$. Taking the direct limit over these maps, one can verify that this defines a reduced homology theory

$$h_q(X) = \varinjlim _{n} \pi_{q+n}^s(X \wedge K(G,n))$$

on CW complexes. Since $h_q(S^0) = \varinjlim \pi_{q+n}^s(K(G,n))$ vanishes for $q \neq 0$, $h_*$ agrees with reduced singular homology $\tilde{H}_*(\cdot,G)$ with coefficients in G on CW-complexes.

=== Functoriality ===
It follows from the universal coefficient theorem for cohomology that the Eilenberg MacLane space is a quasi-functor of the group; that is, for each positive integer $n$ if $a\colon G \to G'$ is any homomorphism of abelian groups, then there is a non-empty set

$$K(a,n) = \{[f]: f\colon K(G,n) \to K(G',n), H_n(f) = a\},$$

satisfying $K(a \circ b,n) \supset K(a,n) \circ K(b,n) \text{ and } 1 \in K(1,n),$ where $[f]$ denotes the homotopy class of a continuous map $f$ and $S \circ T := \{s \circ t: s \in S, t \in T \}.$

=== Relation with Postnikov/Whitehead towers ===
Every connected CW-complex $X$ possesses a Postnikov tower, that is an inverse system of spaces:

$$\cdots \to X_3 \xrightarrow{p_3} X_2 \xrightarrow{p_2}  X_1 \simeq K(\pi_1(X), 1)$$

such that for every $n$:

1. there are commuting maps $X \to X_n$, which induce isomorphism on $\pi_i$ for $i \leq n$ ,
2. $\pi_i(X_n) = 0$ for $i > n$,
3. the maps $X_n \xrightarrow{p_n} X_{n-1}$ are fibrations with fiber $K(\pi_n(X),n)$.

Dually there exists a Whitehead tower, which is a sequence of CW-complexes:

$$\cdots \to X_3 \to X_2 \to X_1 \to X$$

such that for every $n$:

1. the maps $X_n \to X$ induce isomorphism on $\pi_i$ for $i > n$,
2. $X_n$ is n-connected,
3. the maps $X_n \to X_{n-1}$ are fibrations with fiber $K(\pi_n(X), n-1)$.

With help of Serre spectral sequences computations of higher homotopy groups of spheres can be made. For instance $\pi_4(S^3)$ and $\pi_5(S^3)$ using a Whitehead tower of $S^3$ can be found here, more generally those of $\pi_{n+i}(S^n) \ i \leq 3$ using a Postnikov systems can be found here.

=== Cohomology operations ===
For fixed natural numbers m,n and abelian groups G,H exists a bijection between the set of all cohomology operations $\Theta :H^m(\cdot,G) \to H^n(\cdot,H)$ and $H^n(K(G,m),H)$ defined by $\Theta \mapsto \Theta(u)$, where $u \in H^m(K(G,m),G)$ is the fundamental class as defined in #Bijection between homotopy classes of maps and cohomology.

As a result, cohomology operations cannot decrease the degree of the cohomology groups and degree preserving cohomology operations are corresponding to coefficient homomorphism $\operatorname{Hom}(G,H)$. This follows from the Universal coefficient theorem for cohomology and the (m-1)-connectedness of $K(G,m)$.

Some interesting examples for cohomology operations are Steenrod Squares and Powers, when $G=H$ are finite cyclic groups. When studying those the importance of the cohomology of $K(\Z /p ,n)$ with coefficients in $\Z /p$ becomes apparent quickly; some extensive tabeles of those groups can be found here.

=== Group (co)homology ===
One can define the group (co)homology of G with coefficients in the group A as the singular (co)homology of the Eilenberg–MacLane space $K(G,1)$ with coefficients in A.

=== Further applications ===
The loop space construction described above is used in string theory to obtain, for example, the string group, the fivebrane group and so on, as the Whitehead tower arising from the short exact sequence

$$0\to K(\Z,2)\to \operatorname{String}(n)\to \operatorname{Spin}(n)\to 0$$

with $\operatorname{String}(n)$ the string group, and $\operatorname{Spin}(n)$ the spin group. The relevance of $K(\Z,2)$ lies in the fact that there are the homotopy equivalences

$$K(\mathbb{Z},1) \simeq U(1) \simeq B\Z$$

for the classifying space $B\Z$, and the fact $K(\Z,2) \simeq BU(1)$. Notice that because the complex spin group is a group extension

$$0\to K(\Z,1) \to \operatorname{Spin}^\Complex(n) \to \operatorname{Spin}(n) \to 0$$,

the String group can be thought of as a "higher" complex spin group extension, in the sense of higher group theory since the space $K(\Z,2)$ is an example of a higher group. It can be thought of the topological realization of the groupoid $\mathbf{B}U(1)$ whose object is a single point and whose morphisms are the group $U(1)$. Because of these homotopical properties, the construction generalizes: any given space $K(\Z,n)$ can be used to start a short exact sequence that kills the homotopy group $\pi_{n+1}$ in a topological group.

== See also ==
- Classifying space, for the case $n = 1$
- Brown representability theorem, regarding representation spaces
- Moore space, the homology analogue
- Hopf–Whitney theorem, application to calculate homotopy classes
