= Hodge–de Rham spectral sequence =

In mathematics, the Hodge–de Rham spectral sequence (named in honor of W. V. D. Hodge and Georges de Rham) or Frölicher spectral sequence (named after Alfred Frölicher, who actually discovered it; Frölicher (1955)) is a spectral sequence that describes the precise relationship between the Dolbeault cohomology and the de Rham cohomology of a general complex manifold. On a compact Kähler manifold, the sequence degenerates, thereby leading to the Hodge decomposition of the de Rham cohomology.

It is a tool in the theory of complex manifolds for expressing the potential failure of the results of cohomology theory that are valid in general only for Kähler manifolds. A spectral sequence is set up, the degeneration of which would give the results of Hodge theory and Dolbeault's theorem.

== Description of the spectral sequence ==
The spectral sequence is as follows:

$$H^q(X, \Omega^p) \Rightarrow H^{p+q}(X, \mathbf C)$$

where X is a complex manifold, $H^{p+q}(X, \mathbf C)$ is its cohomology with complex coefficients and the left hand term, which is the $E_1$-page of the spectral sequence, is the cohomology with values in the sheaf of holomorphic differential forms. The existence of the spectral sequence as stated above follows from the Poincaré lemma, which gives a quasi-isomorphism of complexes of sheaves

$$\mathbf C \rightarrow \Omega^* := [\Omega^0 \stackrel d \to \Omega^1 \stackrel d \to \cdots \to \Omega^{\dim X}],$$

together with the usual spectral sequence resulting from a filtered object, in this case the Hodge filtration

$$F^p \Omega^* := [\cdots \to 0 \to \Omega^p \to \Omega^{p+1} \to \cdots ]$$

of $\Omega^*$.

== Degeneration ==
The central theorem related to this spectral sequence is that for a compact Kähler manifold X, for example a projective variety, the above spectral sequence degenerates at the $E_1$-page. In particular, it gives an isomorphism referred to as the Hodge decomposition

$$\bigoplus_{p+q=n} H^p(X, \Omega^q) = H^{n}(X, \mathbf C).$$

The degeneration of the spectral sequence can be shown using Hodge theory. An extension of this degeneration in a relative situation, for a proper smooth map $f: X \to S$, was also shown by Deligne.

== Purely algebraic proof ==
For smooth proper varieties over a field of characteristic 0, the spectral sequence can also be written as

$$H^q(X, \Omega^p) \Rightarrow H^{p+q}(X, \Omega^*),$$

where $\Omega^p$ denotes the sheaf of algebraic differential forms (also known as Kähler differentials) on X, $\Omega^*$ is the (algebraic) de Rham complex, consisting of the $\Omega^q$ with the differential being the exterior derivative. In this guise, all terms in the spectral sequence are of purely algebraic (as opposed to analytic) nature. In particular, the question of the degeneration of this spectral sequence makes sense for varieties over a field of characteristic p>0.

Deligne & Illusie (1987) showed that for a smooth proper scheme X over a perfect field k of positive characteristic p, the spectral sequence degenerates, provided that dim(X)<p and X admits a smooth proper lift over the ring of Witt vectors W_{2}(k) of length two (for example, for k=F_{p}, this ring would be Z/p^{2}). Their proof uses the Cartier isomorphism, which only exists in positive characteristic. This degeneration result in characteristic p>0 can then be used to also prove the degeneration for the spectral sequence for X over a field of characteristic 0.

== Non-commutative version ==
The de Rham complex and also the de Rham cohomology of a variety admit generalizations to non-commutative geometry. This more general setup studies dg categories. To a dg category, one can associate its Hochschild homology, and also its periodic cyclic homology. When applied to the category of perfect complexes on a smooth proper variety X, these invariants give back differential forms, respectively, de Rham cohomology of X. Kontsevich and Soibelman conjectured in 2009 that for any smooth and proper dg category C over a field of characteristic 0, the Hodge–de Rham spectral sequence starting with Hochschild homology and abutting to periodic cyclic homology, degenerates:

$$HH_*(C / k)[u^{\pm 1}] \Rightarrow HP_*(C / k).$$

This conjecture was proved by Kaledin (2008) and Kaledin (2016) by adapting the above idea of Deligne and Illusie to the generality of smooth and proper dg-categories. Mathew (2020) has given a proof of this degeneration using topological Hochschild homology.

== See also ==
- Hodge theory
- Jacobian ideal - useful for computing cohomology of Hodge decomposition
