= Morava E-theory =

In the theory of spectra in mathematics, a Morava E-theory (also called Lubin–Tate theory or Johnson–Wilson theory) is a particular spectrum or equivalently generalized (co)homology theory. For a prime number $p$ (obmitted in notation), these form a sequence $E(n)$ of spectra, hence one for each natural number $n\in\mathbb{N}$. Morava E-theories form the foundation of chromatic homotopy theory, in which a spectrum is separated into so-called (mono)chromatic layers by using its various Bousfield localizations with respect to the different Morava E-theories, so-called chromatic localizations $L_{E(n)}$. Morava E-theory is named after Jack Morava, who introduced it in unpublished preprints in the 1970s.

== Definition ==
For a perfect field $\mathbb{K}$, hence in which every irreducible polynomial is separable, of characteristic $p$, let $W(\mathbb{K})$ be its ring of Witt vectors. Let $R=W(\mathbb{K})[v_1,\ldots,v_{n-1}]$ be the polynomial ring in $n-1$ variables, called Lubin–Tate ring. According to Landweber's exact functor theorem, a formal group law over the Lubin–Tate ring defines a generalized cohomology theory, which according to Brown's representability theorem is represented by a spectrum, which is Morava E-theory $E(n)$. It fulfills:

$$\pi_0E(n)
=R[\beta^{\pm 1}]$$

for its ring of coefficients with $\beta\in R$ in second degree.

== Properties ==
- The chromatic localization $L_{E(n)}$ preserves smash products.
- $E(n)$ is Bousfield equivalent to $E(n-1)\times K(n)$. ($K(n)$ is Morava K-theory. Two spectra are Bousfield equivalent, when their generalized homology theories vanish on the exact same topological spaces. Hence for every topological space $X$, one has $E(n)_*(X)=0$ if and only if $E(n-1)_*(X)=0$ and $K(n)_*(X)=0$.)
- $E(n)$ is $K(n)$-local. ($K(n)$ is Morava K-theory. $K(n)$-local means that every spectrum morphism $X\rightarrow E(n)$ from a $K(n)$-acyclic spectrum $X$ is nullhomotopic. $K(n)$-acyclic means that $K(n)\wedge X\simeq 0$.)
- A connected closed spin 10-manifold is generalized oriented in second Morava E-theory $E(2)$ (for $p=2$) if and only if its seventh integral Stiefel–Whitney class $W_7$ vanishes.

== E(n)-local spheres ==
For the sphere spectrum $\mathbb{S}$ (with $\mathbb{S}_n=S^n$), its chromatic localizations $L_{E(n)}\mathbb{S}$ are also called $E(n)$-local spheres.

== See also ==
- Morava K-theory

== Literature ==
- Morava, Jack (1973). "Boarding School Lecture Notes" (PDF). math.mit.edu. Princeton University.
- Hopkins, Mike (1999). "Complex oriented cohomology theories and the language of stacks" (PDF). ncatlab.org. MIT.
- Lurie, Jacob (2010-04-27). "Morava E-Theory and Morava K-Theory (Lecture 22)" (PDF). people.math.harvard.edu. Harvard University.
- Lurie, Jacob (2010-04-27). "The Bousfield Classes of E(n) and K(n) (Lecture 23)" (PDF). people.math.harvard.edu. Harvard University.
- Lurie, Jacob (2010-04-27). "The Image of J (Lecture 35)" (PDF). people.math.harvard.edu. Harvard University.
