= Jack Morava =

American mathematician (1944–2025)

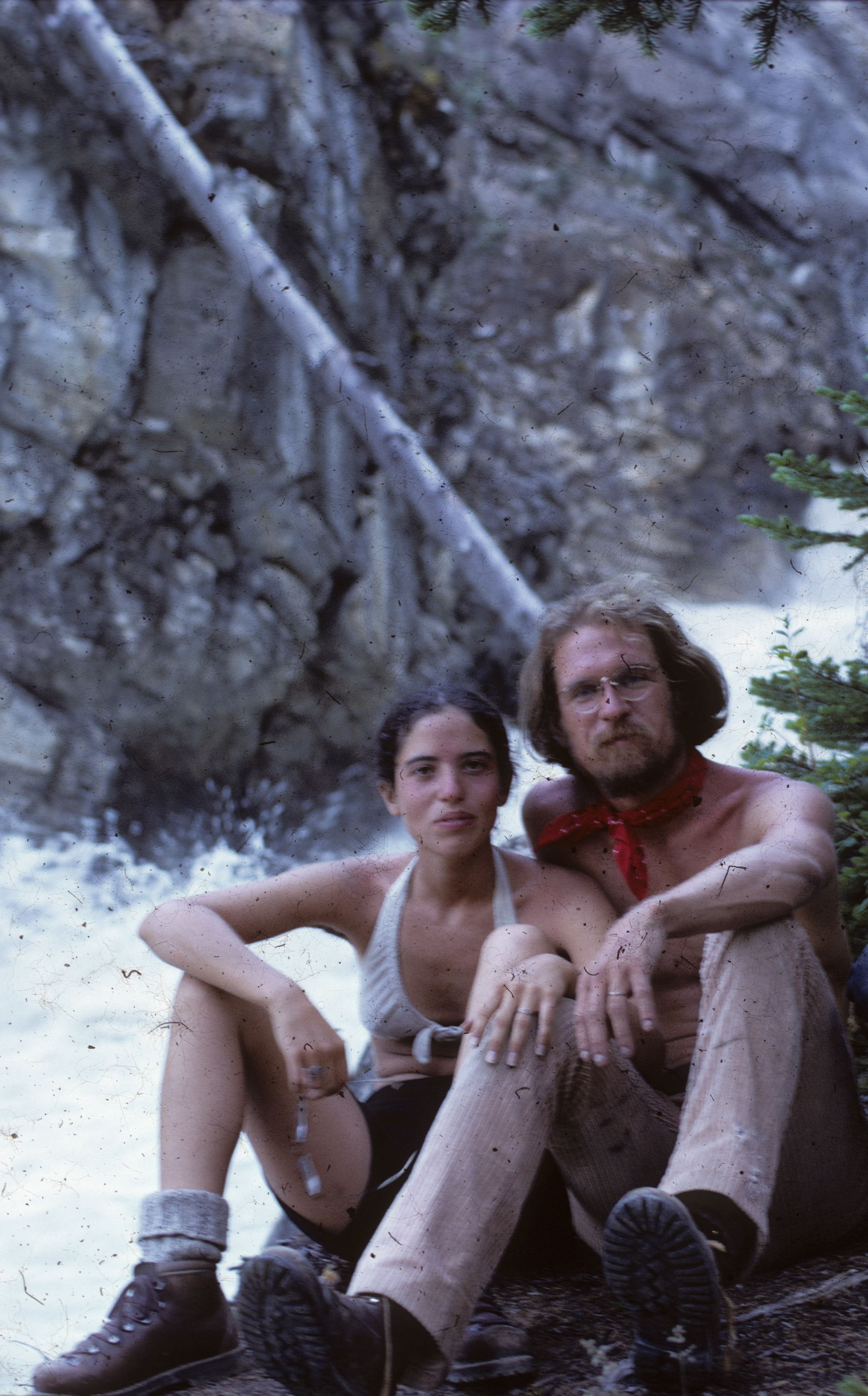
- Jack Morava and his wife Ellen Contini-Morava near the Burgess Shale, 1971
- Born: August 6, 1944; Texas, United States
- Died: August 1, 2025 (aged 80); Boston, Massachusetts, United States
- Education: Rice University
- Known for: Morava E-theory; Morava K-theory
- Spouse: Ellen Contini-Morava
- Children: 2
- Scientific career
- Fields: Algebraic topology
- Workplaces: Johns Hopkins University; Institute for Advanced Study; University of Oxford
- Thesis: Algebraic topology of Fredholm maps (1968)
- Doctoral advisor: Eldon Dyer
- Doctoral students: Satyan Devadoss
- Website: mathematics.jhu.edu/directory/jack-morava/

Jack Johnson Morava (August 6, 1944 – August 1, 2025) was an American mathematician at Johns Hopkins University. Morava specialized in homotopy theory and is credited for Morava E-theory and Morava K-theory, both classes of cohomology theories.

== Early life and education ==
Morava was born in Mercedes, Texas on August 6, 1944. Of Czech and Appalachian descent, he was raised in Texas' lower Rio Grande valley. An early interest in topology was strongly encouraged by his parents. He enrolled at Rice University in 1962 as a physics major, but (with the help of Jim Douglas) entered the graduate mathematics program in 1964. He obtained his PhD in 1968, with thesis Algebraic topology of Fredholm maps written under the direction of Eldon Dyer. His advisor arranged, with the support of Michael Atiyah, a one-year fellowship at the University of Oxford, followed by a year in Princeton at the Institute for Advanced Study.

== Work ==
Morava brought ideas from arithmetic geometry into the realm of algebraic topology. Under Atiyah's tutelage Morava concentrated on the relation between K-theory and cobordism, and when Daniel Quillen's work on that subject appeared he saw that ideas of Sergei Novikov implied close connections between the stable homotopy category and the derived category of quasicoherent sheaves on the moduli stack of one-dimensional formal groups; in particular, that the category of spectra is naturally stratified by height. Using work of Dennis Sullivan, he focused attention on certain ring spectra parametrized by one-dimensional formal group laws over a field, which generalize classical topological K-theory. From a modern point of view (i.e., since Ethan Devinatz, Michael J. Hopkins, and Jeffrey H. Smith's proof of Douglas Ravenel's nilpotence conjecture), it is natural to think of these cohomology theories as the geometric points associated to the prime ideals of the stable homotopy category. Their groups of multiplicative automorphisms are essentially the units in certain p-adic division algebras, and thus have deep connections to local class field theory.

He joined the Johns Hopkins University faculty in 1979, and was involved in organizing the Japan-US Mathematics Institute there. Much of his later work involves the application of cobordism categories to mathematical physics, as well as Tannakian descent theory in homotopy categories (posted mostly on the ArXiv). From roughly 2006 to 2010 he was active in DARPA's fundamental questions of biology initiative.

== Personal life and death ==
In 1970 he and the linguistic anthropologist Ellen Lee Contini married; they had two children, Aili and Michael. They spent a year at the Steklov Institute of Mathematics in Moscow on a US National Academy of Sciences fellowship, where he was influenced by contact with Vladimir Arnold, Israel Gelfand, Yuri I. Manin, and Novikov.

Morava died in Boston on August 1, 2025, at the age of 80.

== See also ==
- Morava K-theory

== Sources ==
- Michael J. Hopkins, Global methods in homotopy theory, in Homotopy theory (Durham, 1985), 73–96, London Math. Soc. Lecture Note Ser., 117, Cambridge Univ. Press, Cambridge, 1987
- Urs Würgler, Morava K-theories: a survey, in Algebraic topology Poznan 1989, 111–138, Lecture Notes in Math., 1474, Springer, Berlin, 1991
- Mark Hovey, Neil P. Strickland, Morava K-theories and localisation, Mem. Amer. Math. Soc. 139 (666), 1999
- Paul Goerss, (Pre-)sheaves of ring spectra over the moduli stack of formal group laws, in Axiomatic, enriched and motivic homotopy theory, 101–131, NATO Sci. Ser. II Math. Phys. Chem., 131, Kluwer Acad. Publ., Dordrecht, 2004
- Mark Behrens, Tyler Lawson, Topological automorphic forms, Mem. Amer. Math. Soc. 204 (958), 2010
