= Morava K-theory =

Cohomology theory

In stable homotopy theory, a branch of mathematics, Morava K-theory is one of a collection of cohomology theories introduced in algebraic topology by Jack Morava in unpublished preprints in the early 1970s. For every prime number p (which is suppressed in the notation), it consists of theories K(n) for each nonnegative integer n, each a ring spectrum in the sense of homotopy theory. Johnson & Wilson (1975) published the first account of the theories.

== Overview ==
The theory K(0) agrees with singular homology with rational coefficients, whereas K(1) is a summand of mod-p complex K-theory. The theory K(n) has coefficient ring

F_{p}[v_{n},v_{n}^{−1}]

where v_{n} has degree 2(p^{n} − 1). In particular, Morava K-theory is periodic with this period, in much the same way that complex K-theory has period 2.

== Properties ==
- They have Künneth isomorphisms for arbitrary pairs of spaces: that is, for X and Y CW complexes, we have

$$K(n)_*(X \times Y) \cong K(n)_*(X) \otimes_{K(n)_*} K(n)_*(Y).$$

- For every prime number $p$ and every natural number $n\in\mathbb{N}$, Morava K-theory $K(n)$ is a "field" in the category of ring spectra, meaning the graded ring $\pi_0K(n)$ is even a graded field, meaning every nonzero homogeneous element in it is invertible. Therefore every module spectrum over $K(n)$ is free, meaning it's a wedge of suspensions of $K(n)$.
- They are complex oriented (at least after being periodified by taking the wedge sum of (p^{n} − 1) shifted copies), and the formal group they define has height n.
- Every finite p-local spectrum X has the property that K(n)_{∗}(X) = 0 if and only if n is less than a certain number N, called the type of the spectrum X. By a theorem of Devinatz–Hopkins–Smith, every thick subcategory of the category of finite p-local spectra is the subcategory of type-n spectra for some n.
- A connected closed spin 10-manifold is generalized oriented in second integral Morava K-theory $\widetilde{K}(2)$ (for $p=2$) if and only if its seventh integral Stiefel–Whitney class $W_7$ vanishes.

== K(n)-local spheres ==
For the sphere spectrum $\mathbb{S}$ (with $\mathbb{S}_n=S^n$), its Bousfield localizations $L_{K(n)}\mathbb{S}$ are also called $K(n)$-local spheres.

== See also ==
- Chromatic homotopy theory
- Morava E-theory
