= List of cohomology theories =

This is a list of some of the ordinary and generalized (or extraordinary) homology and cohomology theories in algebraic topology that are defined on the categories of CW complexes or spectra. For other sorts of homology theories see the links at the end of this article.

== Notation ==
- $S=\pi=S^0$ is the sphere spectrum.
- $S^n$ is the spectrum of the $n$-dimensional sphere
- $S^nY=S^n\land Y$ is the $n$th suspension of a spectrum $Y$.
- $[X,Y]$ is the abelian group of morphisms from the spectrum $X$ to the spectrum $Y$, given (roughly) as homotopy classes of maps.
- $[X,Y]_n=[S^nX,Y]$
- $[X,Y]_*$ is the graded abelian group given as the sum of the groups $[X,Y]_n$.
- $\pi_n(X)=[S^n,X]=[S,X]_n$ is the $n$th stable homotopy group of $X$.
- $\pi_*(X)$ is the sum of the groups $\pi_n(X)$, and is called the coefficient ring of $X$ when $X$ is a ring spectrum.
- $X\land Y$ is the smash product of two spectra.

If $X$ is a spectrum, then it defines generalized homology and cohomology theories on the category of spectra as follows:

- $X_n(Y)=[S,X\land Y]_n=[S^n,X\wedge Y]$ is the generalized homology of $Y$,
- $X^n(Y)=[Y,X]_{-n}=[S^{-n}Y, X]$ is the generalized cohomology of $Y$

== Ordinary homology theories ==
These are the theories satisfying the "dimension axiom" of the Eilenberg–Steenrod axioms that the homology of a point vanishes in dimension other than 0. They are determined by an abelian coefficient group $G$, and denoted by $H(X,G)$ (where $G$ is sometimes omitted, especially if it is $\Z$). Usually $G$ is the integers, the rationals, the reals, the complex numbers, or the integers mod a prime $p$.

The cohomology functors of ordinary cohomology theories are represented by Eilenberg–MacLane spaces.

On simplicial complexes, these theories coincide with singular homology and cohomology.

=== Homology and cohomology with integer coefficients. ===
Spectrum: $H$ (Eilenberg–MacLane spectrum of the integers.)

Coefficient ring: $\pi_n(H)=\Z$ if $n=0$, $0$ otherwise.

The original homology theory.

=== Homology and cohomology with rational (or real or complex) coefficients. ===
Spectrum: $HQ$ (Eilenberg–Mac Lane spectrum of the rationals.)

Coefficient ring: $\pi_n(HQ)=\Q$ if $n=0$, $0$ otherwise.

These are the easiest of all homology theories. The homology groups $HQ_n(X)$ are often denoted by $H_n(X,Q)$. The homology groups $H(X,\Q)$, $H(X,\R)$, $H(X,\C)$ with rational, real, and complex coefficients are all similar, and are used mainly when torsion is not of interest (or too complicated to work out). The Hodge decomposition writes the complex cohomology of a complex projective variety as a sum of sheaf cohomology groups.

=== Homology and cohomology with mod p coefficients. ===
Spectrum: $HZ_p$ (Eilenberg–Maclane spectrum of the integers mod $p$.)

Coefficient ring: $\pi_n(HZ_p)=\Z_p$ (integers mod $p$) if $n=0$, $0$ otherwise.

== K-theories ==
The simpler K-theories of a space are often related to vector bundles over the space, and different sorts of K-theories correspond to different structures that can be put on a vector bundle.

=== Real K-theory ===
Spectrum: KO

Coefficient ring: The coefficient groups π_{i}(KO) have period 8 in i, given by the sequence Z, Z_{2}, Z_{2},0, Z, 0, 0, 0, repeated. As a ring, it is generated by a class η in degree 1, a class x_{4} in degree 4, and an invertible class v_{1}^{4} in degree 8, subject to the relations that 2η = η^{3} = ηx_{4} = 0, and x_{4}^{2} = 4v_{1}^{4}.

KO^{0}(X) is the ring of stable equivalence classes of real vector bundles over X. Bott periodicity implies that the K-groups have period 8.

=== Complex K-theory ===
Spectrum: KU (even terms BU or Z × BU, odd terms U).

Coefficient ring: The coefficient ring K^{*}(point) is the ring of Laurent polynomials in a generator of degree 2.

K^{0}(X) is the ring of stable equivalence classes of complex vector bundles over X. Bott periodicity implies that the K-groups have period 2.

=== Quaternionic K-theory ===
Spectrum: KSp

Coefficient ring: The coefficient groups π_{i}(KSp) have period 8 in i, given by the sequence Z, 0, 0, 0,Z, Z_{2}, Z_{2},0, repeated.

KSp^{0}(X) is the ring of stable equivalence classes of quaternionic vector bundles over X. Bott periodicity implies that the K-groups have period 8.

=== K theory with coefficients ===
Spectrum: KG

G is some abelian group; for example the localization Z_{(p)} at the prime p. Other K-theories can also be given coefficients.

=== Self conjugate K-theory ===
Spectrum: KSC

Coefficient ring: to be written...

The coefficient groups $\pi_i$(KSC) have period 4 in i, given by the sequence Z, Z_{2}, 0, Z, repeated. Introduced by Donald W. Anderson in his unpublished 1964 University of California, Berkeley Ph.D. dissertation, "A new cohomology theory".

=== Connective K-theories ===
Spectrum: ku for connective K-theory, ko for connective real K-theory.

Coefficient ring: For ku, the coefficient ring is the ring of polynomials over Z on a single class v_{1} in dimension 2. For ko, the coefficient ring is the quotient of a polynomial ring on three generators, η in dimension 1, x_{4} in dimension 4, and v_{1}^{4} in dimension 8, the periodicity generator, modulo the relations that 2η = 0, x_{4}^{2} = 4v_{1}^{4}, η^{3} = 0, and ηx = 0.

Roughly speaking, this is K-theory with the negative dimensional parts killed off.

=== KR-theory ===
This is a cohomology theory defined for spaces with involution, from which many of the other K-theories can be derived.

== Bordism and cobordism theories ==
Cobordism studies manifolds, where a manifold is regarded as "trivial" if it is the boundary of another compact manifold. The cobordism classes of manifolds form a ring that is usually the coefficient ring of some generalized cohomology theory. There are many such theories, corresponding roughly to the different structures that one can put on a manifold.

The functors of cobordism theories are often represented by Thom spaces of certain groups.

=== Stable homotopy and cohomotopy ===
Spectrum: S (sphere spectrum).

Coefficient ring: The coefficient groups π_{n}(S) are the stable homotopy groups of spheres, which are notoriously hard to compute or understand for n > 0. (For n < 0 they vanish, and for n = 0 the group is Z.)

Stable homotopy is closely related to cobordism of framed manifolds (manifolds with a trivialization of the normal bundle).

=== Unoriented cobordism ===
Spectrum: MO (Thom spectrum of orthogonal group)

Coefficient ring: π_{*}(MO) is the ring of cobordism classes of unoriented manifolds, and is a polynomial ring over the field with 2 elements on generators of degree i for every i not of the form 2^{n}−1. That is: $\mathbb{Z}_2 [ x_2 , x_4 , x_5 , x_6 , x_8 \cdots]$ where $x_{2n}$ can be represented by the classes of $\mathbb{RP}^{2n}$ while for odd indices one can use appropriate Dold manifolds.

Unoriented bordism is 2-torsion, since 2M is the boundary of $M \times I$.

MO is a rather weak cobordism theory, as the spectrum MO is isomorphic to H(π_{*}(MO)) ("homology with coefficients in π_{*}(MO)") – MO is a product of Eilenberg–MacLane spectra. In other words, the corresponding homology and cohomology theories are no more powerful than homology and cohomology with coefficients in Z/2Z. This was the first cobordism theory to be described completely.

=== Complex cobordism ===
Spectrum: MU (Thom spectrum of unitary group)

Coefficient ring: π_{*}(MU) is the polynomial ring on generators of degree 2, 4, 6, 8, ... and is naturally isomorphic to Lazard's universal ring, and is the cobordism ring of stably almost complex manifolds.

=== Oriented cobordism ===
Spectrum: MSO (Thom spectrum of special orthogonal group)

Coefficient ring: The oriented cobordism class of a manifold is completely determined by its characteristic numbers: its Stiefel–Whitney numbers and Pontryagin numbers, but the overall coefficient ring, denoted $\Omega_* = \Omega(*) = MSO(*)$ is quite complicated. Rationally, and at 2 (corresponding to Pontryagin and Stiefel–Whitney classes, respectively), MSO is a product of Eilenberg–MacLane spectra – $MSO_{\mathbf Q} = H(\pi_*(MSO_{\mathbf Q}))$ and $MSO[2] = H(\pi_*(MSO[2]))$ – but at odd primes it is not, and the structure is complicated to describe. The ring has been completely described integrally, due to work of John Milnor, Boris Averbuch, Vladimir Rokhlin, and C. T. C. Wall.

=== Special unitary cobordism ===
Spectrum: MSU (Thom spectrum of special unitary group)

Coefficient ring:

=== Spin cobordism (and variants) ===
Spectrum: MSpin (Thom spectrum of spin group)

Coefficient ring: See (D. W. Anderson, E. H. Brown & F. P. Peterson 1967).

=== Symplectic cobordism ===
Spectrum: MSp (Thom spectrum of symplectic group)

Coefficient ring:

=== PL cobordism and topological cobordism ===
Spectrum: MPL, MSPL, MTop, MSTop

Coefficient ring:

The definition is similar to cobordism, except that one uses piecewise linear or topological instead of smooth manifolds, either oriented or unoriented. The coefficient rings are complicated.

=== Brown–Peterson cohomology ===
Spectrum: BP

Coefficient ring: π_{*}(BP) is a polynomial algebra over Z_{(p)} on generators v_{n} of dimension 2(p^{n} − 1) for n ≥ 1.

Brown–Peterson cohomology BP is a summand of MU_{p}, which is complex cobordism MU localized at a prime p. In fact MU_{(p)} is a sum of suspensions of BP.

=== Morava K-theory ===
Spectrum: K(n) (They also depend on a prime p.)

Coefficient ring: F_{p}[v_{n}, v_{n}^{−1}], where v_{n} has degree 2(p^{n} -1).

These theories have period 2(p^{n} − 1). They are named after Jack Morava.

=== Johnson–Wilson theory ===
Spectrum E(n)

Coefficient ring Z_{(2)}[v_{1}, ..., v_{n}, 1/v_{n}] where v_{i} has degree 2(2^{i}−1)

=== String cobordism ===
Spectrum:

Coefficient ring:

== Theories related to elliptic curves ==
=== Elliptic cohomology ===
Spectrum: Ell

=== Topological modular forms ===
Spectra: tmf, TMF (previously called eo_{2}.)

The coefficient ring π_{*}(tmf) is called the ring of topological modular forms. TMF is tmf with the 24th power of the modular form Δ inverted, and has period 24^{2}=576. At the prime p = 2, the completion of tmf is the spectrum eo_{2}, and the K(2)-localization of tmf is the Hopkins-Miller Higher Real K-theory spectrum EO_{2}.

== See also ==
- Alexander–Spanier cohomology
- Algebraic K-theory
- BRST cohomology
- Cellular homology
- Čech cohomology
- Crystalline cohomology
- De Rham cohomology
- Deligne cohomology
- Étale cohomology
- Floer homology
- Galois cohomology
- Group cohomology
- Hodge structure
- Intersection cohomology
- L^{2} cohomology
- l-adic cohomology
- Lie algebra cohomology
- Quantum cohomology
- Sheaf cohomology
- Singular homology
- Spencer cohomology
