= Brown–Peterson cohomology =

Mathematical generalized cohomology theory

In mathematics, Brown–Peterson cohomology is a generalized cohomology theory introduced by Edgar H. Brown and Franklin P. Peterson (1966), depending on a choice of prime p. It is described in detail by Douglas Ravenel (2003, Chapter 4). Its representing spectrum is denoted by $\text{BP}$.

== Complex cobordism and Quillen's idempotent ==
Brown–Peterson cohomology $\text{BP}$ is a summand of MU_{($p$)}, which is complex cobordism MU localized at a prime $p$. In fact MU_{($p$)} is a wedge product of suspensions of $\text{BP}$.

For each prime $p$, Daniel Quillen showed there is a unique idempotent map of ring spectra ε from MUQ_{($p$)} to itself, with the property that $\epsilon_*([CP^n])$ is [CP^{$n$}] if $n+1$ is a power of $p$, and $0$ otherwise. The spectrum $\text{BP}$ is the image of this idempotent ε.

== Structure of $\text{BP}$ ==
The coefficient ring $\pi_*(\text{BP})$ is a polynomial algebra over $\Z_{(p)}$ on generators $v_n$ in degrees $2(p^n-1)$ for $n\ge 1$.

$\text{BP}_*(\text{BP})$ is isomorphic to the polynomial ring $\pi_*(\text{BP})[t_1, t_2, \ldots]$ over $\pi_*(\text{BP})$ with generators $t_i$ in $\text{BP}_{2 (p^i-1)}(\text{BP})$ of degrees $2 (p^i-1)$.

The cohomology of the Hopf algebroid $(\pi_*(\text{BP}), \text{BP}_*(\text{BP}))$ is the initial term of the Adams–Novikov spectral sequence for calculating $p$-local homotopy groups of spheres.

$\text{BP}$ is the universal example of a complex oriented cohomology theory whose associated formal group law is $p$-typical.

== See also ==
- List of cohomology theories#Brown–Peterson cohomology
