= G-spectrum =

In algebraic topology, a G-spectrum is a spectrum with an action of a (finite) group.

Let X be a spectrum with an action of a finite group G. The important notion is that of the homotopy fixed point set $X^{hG}$. There is always

$$X^G \to X^{hG},$$

a map from the fixed point spectrum to a homotopy fixed point spectrum (because, by definition, $X^{hG}$ is the mapping spectrum $F(BG_+, X)^G$).

Example: $\mathbb{Z}/2$ acts on the complex K-theory KU by taking the conjugate bundle of a complex vector bundle. Then $KU^{h\mathbb{Z}/2} = KO$, the real K-theory.

The cofiber of $X_{hG} \to X^{hG}$ is called the Tate spectrum of X.

== G-Galois extension in the sense of Rognes ==
This notion is due to J. Rognes (Rognes 2008). Let A be an E_{∞}-ring with an action of a finite group G and B = A^{hG} its invariant subring. Then B → A (the map of B-algebras in E_{∞}-sense) is said to be a G-Galois extension if the natural map

$$A \otimes_B A \to \prod_{g \in G} A$$

(which generalizes $x \otimes y \mapsto (g(x) y)$ in the classical setup) is an equivalence. The extension is faithful if the Bousfield classes of A, B over B are equivalent.

Example: KO → KU is a $\mathbb{Z}$./2-Galois extension.

== See also ==
- Segal conjecture
