= Bousfield class =

In algebraic topology, the Bousfield class of, say, a spectrum X is the set of all (say) spectra Y whose smash product with X is zero: $X \otimes Y = 0$. Two objects are Bousfield equivalent if their Bousfield classes are the same.

The notion applies to module spectra and in that case one usually qualifies a ring spectrum over which the smash product is taken.

== See also ==
- Bousfield localization
