= 𝕊 =

$\mathbb{S}$ is the blackboard bold letter S. It can refer to:

- The n-dimensional sphere $\mathbb{S}^n$
- The sphere spectrum
- The algebra of sedenions
