= Topological Hochschild homology =

In mathematics, Topological Hochschild homology is a topological refinement of Hochschild homology which rectifies some technical issues with computations in characteristic $p$. For instance, if we consider the $\mathbb{Z}$-algebra $\mathbb{F}_p$ then

$$HH_k(\mathbb{F}_p/\mathbb{Z}) \cong \begin{cases}
\mathbb{F}_p & k \text{ even} \\
0 & k \text{ odd}
\end{cases}$$

but if we consider the ring structure on

$$\begin{align}
HH_*(\mathbb{F}_p/\mathbb{Z}) &= \mathbb{F}_p\langle u \rangle \\
&= \mathbb{F}_p[u,u^2/2!, u^3/3!,\ldots]
\end{align}$$

(as a divided power algebra structure) then there is a significant technical issue: if we set $u \in HH_2(\mathbb{F}_p/\mathbb{Z})$, so $u^2 \in HH_4(\mathbb{F}_p/\mathbb{Z})$, and so on, we have $u^p = 0$ from the resolution of $\mathbb{F}_p$ as an algebra over $\mathbb{F}_p\otimes^\mathbf{L}\mathbb{F}_p$, i.e.

$HH_k(\mathbb{F}_p/\mathbb{Z}) = H_k(\mathbb{F}_p\otimes_{ \mathbb{F}_p\otimes^\mathbf{L}\mathbb{F}_p }\mathbb{F}_p)$

This calculation is further elaborated on the Hochschild homology page, but the key point is the pathological behavior of the ring structure on the Hochschild homology of $\mathbb{F}_p$. In contrast, the Topological Hochschild Homology ring has the isomorphism

$THH_*(\mathbb{F}_p) = \mathbb{F}_p[u]$

giving a less pathological theory. Moreover, this calculation forms the basis of many other THH calculations, such as for smooth algebras $A/\mathbb{F}_p$

== Construction ==
Recall that the Eilenberg–MacLane spectrum can be embed ring objects in the derived category of the integers $D(\mathbb{Z})$ into ring spectrum over the ring spectrum of the stable homotopy group of spheres. This makes it possible to take a commutative ring $A$ and constructing a complex analogous to the Hochschild complex using the monoidal product in ring spectra, namely, $\wedge_\mathbb{S}$ acts formally like the derived tensor product $\otimes^\mathbf{L}$ over the integers. We define the Topological Hochschild complex of $A$ (which could be a commutative differential graded algebra, or just a commutative algebra) as the simplicial complex, ^{pg 33-34} called the Bar complex

$\cdots \to HA\wedge_\mathbb{S}HA\wedge_\mathbb{S}HA \to HA\wedge_\mathbb{S}HA \to HA$

of spectra (note that the arrows are incorrect because of Wikipedia formatting...). Because simplicial objects in spectra have a realization as a spectrum, we form the spectrum

$THH(A) \in \text{Spectra}$

which has homotopy groups $\pi_i(THH(A))$ defining the topological Hochschild homology of the ring object $A$.

== See also ==
- Revisiting THH(F_p)
- Topological cyclic homology of the integers
