= K-theory spectrum =

In mathematics, given a ring R, the K-theory spectrum of R is an Ω-spectrum $K_R$ whose nth term is given by, writing $\Sigma R$ for the suspension of R,

$$(K_R)_n = K_0(\Sigma^n R) \times BGL(\Sigma^n R)^+$$,

where "+" means the Quillen's + construction. By definition, $K_i(R) = \pi_i(K_R)$.
