= Complex cobordism =

In mathematics, complex cobordism is a generalized cohomology theory related to cobordism of manifolds. Its spectrum is denoted by MU. It is an exceptionally powerful cohomology theory, but can be quite hard to compute, so often instead of using it directly one uses some slightly weaker theories derived from it, such as Brown–Peterson cohomology or Morava K-theory, that are easier to compute.

The generalized homology and cohomology complex cobordism theories were introduced by Michael Atiyah (1961) using the Thom spectrum.

== Spectrum of complex cobordism ==
The complex bordism $MU^*(X)$ of a space $X$ is roughly the group of bordism classes of manifolds over $X$ with a complex linear structure on the stable normal bundle. Complex bordism is a generalized homology theory, corresponding to a spectrum MU that can be described explicitly in terms of Thom spaces as follows.

The space $MU(n)$ is the Thom space of the universal $n$-plane bundle over the classifying space $BU(n)$ of the unitary group $U(n)$. The natural inclusion from $U(n)$ into $U(n+1)$ induces a map from the double suspension $\Sigma^2MU(n)$ to $MU(n+1)$. Together these maps give the spectrum $MU$; namely, it is the homotopy colimit of $MU(n)$.

Examples: $MU(0)$ is the sphere spectrum. $MU(1)$ is the desuspension $\Sigma^{\infty -2} \mathbb{CP}^\infty$ of $\mathbb{CP}^\infty$.

The nilpotence theorem states that, for any ring spectrum $R$, the kernel of $\pi_* R \to \operatorname{MU}_*(R)$ consists of nilpotent elements. The theorem implies in particular that, if $\mathbb{S}$ is the sphere spectrum, then for any $n>0$, every element of $\pi_n \mathbb{S}$ is nilpotent (a theorem of Goro Nishida). (Proof: if $x$ is in $\pi_n S$, then $x$ is a torsion but its image in $\operatorname{MU}_*(\mathbb{S}) \simeq L$, the Lazard ring, cannot be torsion since $L$ is a polynomial ring. Thus, $x$ must be in the kernel.)

== Formal group laws ==
John Milnor (1960) and Sergei Novikov (1960, 1962) showed that the coefficient ring $\pi_*(\operatorname{MU})$ (equal to the complex cobordism of a point, or equivalently the ring of cobordism classes of stably complex manifolds) is a polynomial ring $\Z[x_1,x_2,\ldots]$ on infinitely many generators $x_i \in \pi_{2i}(\operatorname{MU})$ of positive even degrees.

Write $\mathbb{CP}^{\infty}$ for infinite dimensional complex projective space, which is the classifying space for complex line bundles, so that tensor product of line bundles induces a map $\mu : \mathbb{CP}^{\infty} \times \mathbb{CP}^{\infty}\to \mathbb{CP}^{\infty}.$ A complex orientation on an associative commutative ring spectrum E is an element x in $E^2(\mathbb{CP}^{\infty})$ whose restriction to $E^2(\mathbb{CP}^{1})$ is 1, if the latter ring is identified with the coefficient ring of E. A spectrum E with such an element x is called a complex oriented ring spectrum.

If E is a complex oriented ring spectrum, then

$$E^*(\mathbb{CP}^\infty) = E^*(\text{point})[[x]]$$

$$E^*(\mathbb{CP}^\infty)\times E^*(\mathbb{CP}^\infty) = E^*(\text{point})[[x\otimes1, 1\otimes x]]$$

and $\mu^*(x) \in E^*(\text{point})[[x\otimes 1, 1\otimes x]]$ is a formal group law over the ring $E^*(\text{point}) = \pi^*(E)$.

Complex cobordism has a natural complex orientation. Daniel Quillen (1969) showed that there is a natural isomorphism from its coefficient ring to Lazard's universal ring, making the formal group law of complex cobordism into the universal formal group law. In other words, for any formal group law F over any commutative ring R, there is a unique ring homomorphism from MU^{*}(point) to R such that F is the pullback of the formal group law of complex cobordism.

== Brown–Peterson cohomology ==
Complex cobordism over the rationals can be reduced to ordinary cohomology over the rationals, so the main interest is in the torsion of complex cobordism. It is often easier to study the torsion one prime at a time by localizing MU at a prime p; roughly speaking this means one kills off torsion prime to p. The localization MU_{p} of MU at a prime p splits as a sum of suspensions of a simpler cohomology theory called Brown–Peterson cohomology, first described by Brown & Peterson (1966). In practice one often does calculations with Brown–Peterson cohomology rather than with complex cobordism. Knowledge of the Brown–Peterson cohomologies of a space for all primes p is roughly equivalent to knowledge of its complex cobordism.

== Conner–Floyd classes ==
The ring $\operatorname{MU}^*(BU)$ is isomorphic to the formal power series ring $\operatorname{MU}^*(\text{point})[[cf_1, cf_2, \ldots]]$ where the elements cf are called Conner–Floyd classes. They are the analogues of Chern classes for complex cobordism. They were introduced by Conner & Floyd (1966).

Similarly $\operatorname{MU}_*(BU)$ is isomorphic to the polynomial ring $\operatorname{MU}_*(\text{point})[[\beta_1, \beta_2, \ldots]]$

== Cohomology operations ==
The Hopf algebra MU_{*}(MU) is isomorphic to the polynomial algebra R[b_{1}, b_{2}, ...], where R is the reduced bordism ring of a 0-sphere.

The coproduct is given by

$$\psi(b_k) = \sum_{i+j=k}(b)_{2i}^{j+1}\otimes b_j$$

where the notation ()_{2i} means take the piece of degree 2i. This can be interpreted as follows. The map

$$x\to x+b_1x^2+b_2x^3+\cdots$$

is a continuous automorphism of the ring of formal power series in x, and the coproduct of MU_{*}(MU) gives the composition of two such automorphisms.

== See also ==
- Adams–Novikov spectral sequence
- List of cohomology theories
- Algebraic cobordism
