= Cartier isomorphism =

In algebraic geometry, the Cartier isomorphism is a certain isomorphism between the cohomology sheaves of the de Rham complex of a smooth algebraic variety over a field of positive characteristic, and the sheaves of differential forms on the Frobenius twist of the variety. It is named after Pierre Cartier. Intuitively, it shows that de Rham cohomology in positive characteristic is a much larger object than one might expect. It plays an important role in the approach of Deligne and Illusie to the degeneration of the Hodge–de Rham spectral sequence.

== Statement ==
Let k be a field of characteristic p > 0, and let $f: X \to S$ be a morphism of k-schemes. Let $X^{(p)} = X \times_{S,\varphi} S$ denote the Frobenius twist and let $F: X \to X^{(p)}$ be the relative Frobenius. The Cartier map is defined to be the unique morphism
$$C^{-1}: \bigoplus_{i \geq 0} \Omega^i_{X^{(p)}/S} \to \bigoplus_{i \geq 0} \mathcal{H}^i(F_* \Omega^{\bullet}_{X/S})$$
of graded $\mathcal{O}_{X^{(p)}}$-algebras such that $C^{-1}(d(x \otimes 1)) = [x^{p-1} dx]$ for any local section x of $\mathcal{O}_X$. (Here, for the Cartier map to be well-defined in general it is essential that one takes cohomology sheaves for the codomain.) The Cartier isomorphism is then the assertion that the map $C^{-1}$ is an isomorphism if $f$ is a smooth morphism.

In the above, we have formulated the Cartier isomorphism in the form it is most commonly encountered (e.g., in the 1970 paper of Katz). In his original paper, Cartier actually considered the inverse map in a more restrictive setting, whence the notation $C^{-1}$ for the Cartier map.

The smoothness assumption is not essential for the Cartier map to be an isomorphism. For instance, one has it for ind-smooth morphisms since both sides of the Cartier map commute with filtered colimits. By Popescu's theorem, one then has the Cartier isomorphism for a regular morphism of noetherian k-schemes. Ofer Gabber has also proven a Cartier isomorphism for valuation rings. In a different direction, one can dispense with such assumptions entirely if one instead works with derived de Rham cohomology (now taking the associated graded of the conjugate filtration) and the exterior powers of the cotangent complex.
