= Symmetric spectrum =

In algebraic topology, a symmetric spectrum X is a spectrum of pointed simplicial sets that comes with an action of the symmetric group $\Sigma_n$ on $X_n$ such that the composition of structure maps

$$S^1 \wedge \dots \wedge S^1 \wedge X_n \to S^1 \wedge \dots \wedge S^1 \wedge X_{n+1} \to \dots \to S^1 \wedge X_{n+p-1} \to X_{n+p}$$

is equivariant with respect to $\Sigma_p \times \Sigma_n$. A morphism between symmetric spectra is a morphism of spectra that is equivariant with respect to the actions of symmetric groups.

The technical advantage of the category $\mathcal{S}p^\Sigma$ of symmetric spectra is that it has a closed symmetric monoidal structure (with respect to smash product). It is also a simplicial model category. A symmetric ring spectrum is a monoid in $\mathcal{S}p^\Sigma$; if the monoid is commutative, it's a commutative ring spectrum. The possibility of this definition of "ring spectrum" was one of the motivations behind the category.

A similar technical goal is also achieved by May's theory of S-modules, a competing theory.
