= Satyan Devadoss =

American mathematician

- Education: North Central College; Johns Hopkins University
- Awards: Haimo national teaching award Alder national teaching award Fellow of the AMS
- Scientific career
- Fields: Mathematics, topology, geometry
- Workplaces: University of San Diego; Williams College
- Thesis: Tesselations of moduli spaces and the mosaic operad (1999)
- Doctoral advisor: Jack Morava
- Website: satyandevadoss.org

Satyan L. Devadoss is the Fletcher Jones Professor of Applied Mathematics and Professor of Computer Science at the University of San Diego. His research concerns topology and geometry, mostly seen through a discrete and computational lens, with inspiration coming from theoretical physics, phylogenetics, and scientific visualization.

== Academia ==
Devadoss graduated as valedictorian from North Central College in 1993. He earned his Ph.D. in mathematics in 1999 from Johns Hopkins University, under the supervision of Jack Morava. He was a Ross assistant professor at the Ohio State University under Ruth Charney and Mike Davis before joining the faculty at Williams College, receiving tenure and promotion to full-professor. He has held visiting positions at the University of California, Berkeley, the Ohio State University, Harvey Mudd College, the University of California, San Diego, the Mathematical Sciences Research Institute, and Stanford University.

== Awards ==
Devadoss is a recipient of the Henry Alder National Teaching Award (2007), the Northeastern Sectional Award for Distinguished Teaching (2014), and a Deborah and Franklin Haimo Award for Distinguished College or University Teaching of Mathematics (2016), all awarded by the Mathematical Association of America.

In 2012, he became an inaugural Fellow of the American Mathematical Society.

Devadoss has also received the Nelson Bushnell Prize (2012) from Williams College, the Young Alumni Award (2008) from North Central College, and the inaugural William Kelso Morrill Award (1995) from the Johns Hopkins University.

== Works ==
In 2017, Devadoss led a team at the University of San Diego to receive a $1M grant from the Fletcher Jones Foundation for the renovation of his mathematics department. The centerpiece of this renovation was his Math Studio, a laboratory that focuses on the physical questions surrounding mathematics research.

With Joseph O'Rourke, Devadoss is a coauthor of the textbook Discrete and Computational Geometry (Princeton University Press, 2011). With Matt Harvey, he is a coauthor of the tradebook Mage Merlin's Unsolved Mathematical Mysteries (MIT Press, 2020). Devadoss was also recruited by the Great Courses to create the Shape of Nature, a 36-lecture video course focusing on the applications of geometry and topology to the natural world.

He was a cofounder of CereusData, a data visualization company that focuses on storytelling of institutional data.

Devadoss wrote opinion editorials published by the Chicago Tribune (2023) on mathematics and the machines and by the Los Angeles Times (2021) on the tension between the usefulness and wonder of mathematics. He also wrote an opinion editorial in the Washington Post (2018) on the nature of mathematics related to the humanities and the arts. It was chosen by the staff editors as one of their favorite opeds of the year.

== Artworks ==
In 2018, he co-led a team in designing, creating, and showcasing a two-ton metal, wood, and acrylic interactive sculpture titled "Unfolding Humanity" for Burning Man. This sculpture made a return appearance to Burning Man in 2023 as a special Arts Honoraria project. The 12-foot tall dodecahedral artwork, externally skinned with black panels containing 2240 acrylic windows, with the interior lined with mirrors and large enough to hold 15 people, dealt with unsolved questions in mathematics (unfolding polyhedra) and physics (cosmological shape of the universe).

His collection of paintings, titled "Cartography of Tree Space" (jointly created with San Francisco-based artist Owen Schuh) has been on gallery shows in Berlin and Pasadena. As of 2023, the triptych of paintings is in the permanent collection of the Flaten Art Museum.
