= Frölicher space =

In mathematics, Frölicher spaces extend the notions of calculus and smooth manifolds. They were introduced in 1982 by the mathematician Alfred Frölicher.

== Definition ==
A Frölicher space consists of a non-empty set X together with a subset C of Hom(R, X) called the set of smooth curves, and a subset F of Hom(X, R) called the set of smooth real functions, such that for each real function

f : X → R

in F and each curve

c : R → X

in C, the following axioms are satisfied:

1. f in F if and only if for each γ in C, f∘γ in C^{∞}(R, R)
2. c in C if and only if for each φ in F, φ∘c in C^{∞}(R, R)

Let A and B be two Frölicher spaces. A map

m : A → B

is called smooth if for each smooth curve c in C_{A}, m∘c is in C_{B}. Furthermore, the space of all such smooth maps has itself the structure of a Frölicher space. The smooth functions on

C^{∞}(A, B)

are the images of

$$S : F_B \times C_A \times \mathrm{C}^{\infty}(\mathbf{R}, \mathbf{R})' \to \mathrm{Mor}(\mathrm{C}^{\infty}(A, B), \mathbf{R}) : (f, c, \lambda) \mapsto S(f, c, \lambda), \quad S(f, c, \lambda)(m) := \lambda(f \circ m \circ c)$$
