= Phantom map =

In homotopy theory, phantom maps are continuous maps $f: X \to Y$ of CW-complexes for which the restriction of $f$ to any finite subcomplex $Z \subset X$ is inessential (i.e., nullhomotopic). J. Frank Adams and Grant Walker (1964) produced the first known nontrivial example of such a map with $X$ finite-dimensional (answering a question of Paul Olum). Shortly thereafter, the terminology of "phantom map" was coined by Brayton Gray (1966), who constructed a stably essential phantom map from infinite-dimensional complex projective space to $S^3$. The subject was analysed in the thesis of Gray, much of which was elaborated and later published in (Gray & McGibbon 1993). Similar constructions are defined for maps of spectra.

== Definition ==
Let $\alpha$ be a regular cardinal. A morphism $f: x \to y$ in the homotopy category of spectra is called an $\alpha$-phantom map if, for any spectrum s with fewer than $\alpha$ cells, any composite $s \to x \xrightarrow{f} y$ vanishes.
