= Module spectrum =

Mathematical object

In algebra, a module spectrum is a spectrum with an action of a ring spectrum; it generalizes a module in abstract algebra.

The ∞-category of (say right) module spectra is stable; hence, it can be considered as either analog or generalization of the derived category of modules over a ring.

== K-theory ==
Lurie defines the K-theory of a ring spectrum R to be the K-theory of the ∞-category of perfect modules over R (a perfect module being defined as a compact object in the ∞-category of module spectra).

== See also ==
- G-spectrum
