= Ellen Contini-Morava =

Linguistic anthropologist (born 1948)

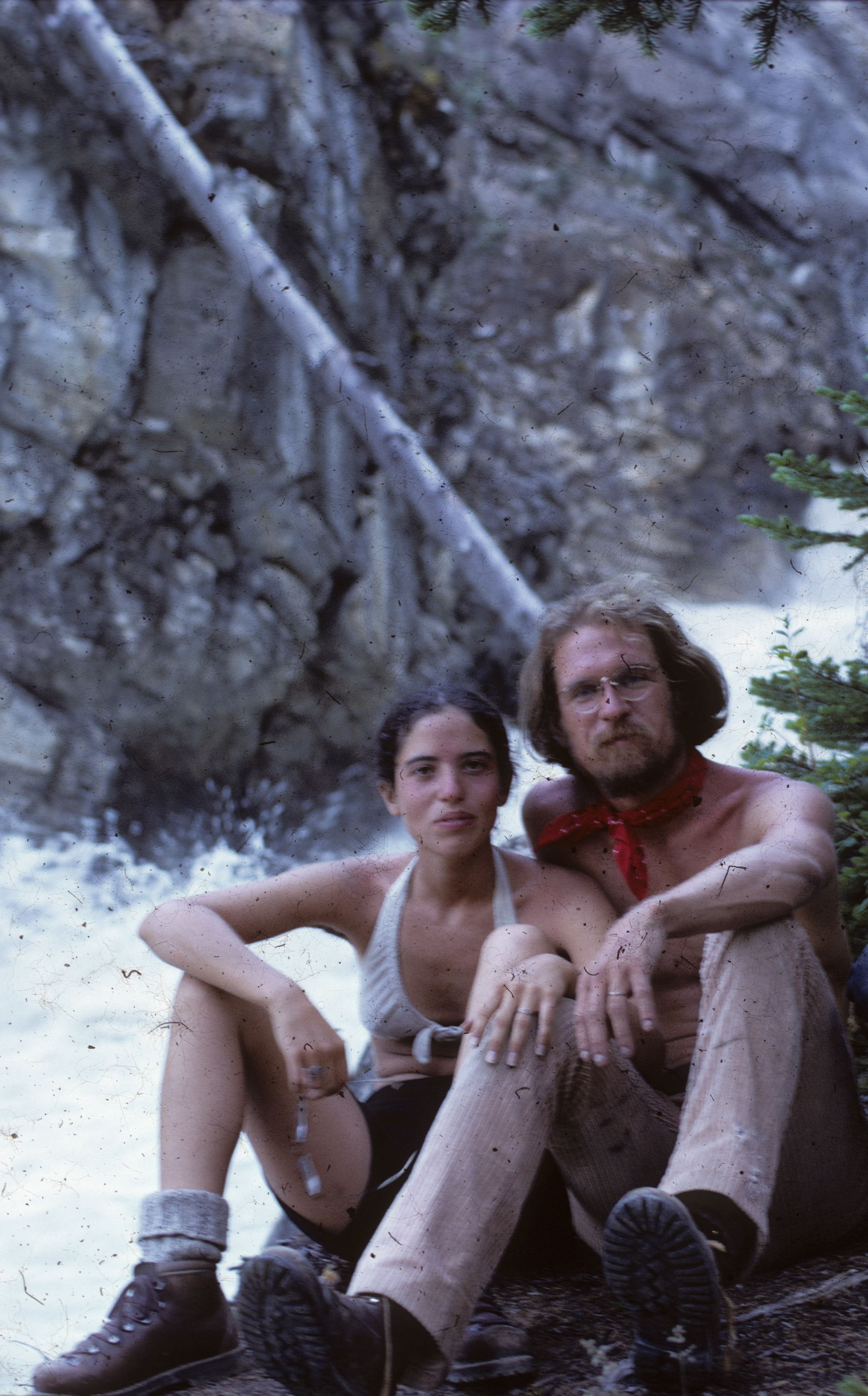
- Contini-Morava (left) with her husband Jack Morava near the Burgess Shale, 1971
- Born: 7 December 1948 (age 77)
- Education: Columbia University 1983 (PhD)
- Occupation: Anthropological linguist
- Known for: Specialization in Bantu languages and Swahili
- Honours: Professor emerita

Ellen Contini-Morava (born 7 December 1948 ) is an American anthropological linguist, interested in the meanings of linguistic forms, discourse analysis, functional linguistics and (noun) classification; in particular, in the relationship between lexicon and grammar. She specializes in Bantu languages in general, and Swahili in particular.

== Education and career ==
Contini-Morava received her PhD from Columbia University in 1983 under William Diver and Erica Garcia. Contini-Morava is a professor emerita at the University of Virginia.

== Books ==
Contini-Morava is the author of the book Discourse Pragmatics and Semantic Categorization: The Case of Negation and Tense-Aspect with Special Reference to Swahili (Mouton de Gruyter, 1989).

Her edited volumes include Between Grammar and Lexicon (edited with Yishai Tobin, John Benjamins, 2000) and Cognitive and Communicative Approaches to Linguistic Analysis (edited with Robert S. Kirsner and Betsy Rodríguez-Bachiller, John Benjamins, 2004).
