= Perfect complex =

In algebra, a perfect complex of modules over a commutative ring A is an object in the derived category of A-modules that is quasi-isomorphic to a bounded complex of finite projective A-modules. A perfect module is a module that is perfect when it is viewed as a complex concentrated at degree zero. For example, if A is Noetherian, a module over A is perfect if and only if it is finitely generated and of finite projective dimension.

== Other characterizations ==
Perfect complexes are precisely the compact objects in the unbounded derived category $D(A)$ of A-modules. They are also precisely the dualizable objects in this category.

A compact object in the ∞-category of (say right) module spectra over a ring spectrum is often called perfect; see also module spectrum.

== Pseudo-coherent sheaf ==
When the structure sheaf $\mathcal{O}_X$ is not coherent, working with coherent sheaves has awkwardness (namely the kernel of a finite presentation can fail to be coherent). Because of this, SGA 6 Expo I introduces the notion of a pseudo-coherent sheaf.

By definition, given a ringed space $(X, \mathcal{O}_X)$, an $\mathcal{O}_X$-module is called pseudo-coherent if for every integer $n \ge 0$, locally, there is a free presentation of finite type of length n; i.e.,

$$L_n \to L_{n-1} \to \cdots \to L_0 \to F \to 0$$.

A complex F of $\mathcal{O}_X$-modules is called pseudo-coherent if, for every integer n, there is locally a quasi-isomorphism $L \to F$ where L has degree bounded above and consists of finite free modules in degree $\ge n$. If the complex consists only of the zero-th degree term, then it is pseudo-coherent if and only if it is so as a module.

Roughly speaking, a pseudo-coherent complex may be thought of as a limit of perfect complexes.

== See also ==
- Hilbert–Burch theorem
- Elliptic complex (related notion; discussed at SGA 6 Exposé II, Appendix II.)

== Bibliography ==
- Berthelot, Pierre; Alexandre Grothendieck; Luc Illusie, eds. (1971). Séminaire de Géométrie Algébrique du Bois Marie - 1966-67 - Théorie des intersections et théorème de Riemann-Roch - (SGA 6) (Lecture notes in mathematics 225). Lecture Notes in Mathematics (in French). Vol. 225. Berlin; New York: Springer-Verlag. xii+700. doi:10.1007/BFb0066283. ISBN 978-3-540-05647-8. MR 0354655.
- Kerz, Moritz; Strunk, Florian; Tamme, Georg (2018). "Algebraic K-theory and descent for blow-ups". Inventiones Mathematicae. 211 (2): 523–577. arXiv:1611.08466. Bibcode:2018InMat.211..523K. doi:10.1007/s00222-017-0752-2.
- Lurie, Jacob (2014). "Algebraic K-Theory and Manifold Topology (Math 281), Lecture 19: K-Theory of Ring Spectra" (PDF).
