= S-object =

In algebraic topology, an $\mathbb{S}$-object (also called a symmetric sequence) is a sequence $\{ X(n) \}$ of objects such that each $X(n)$ comes with an action (Note: An action of a group G on an object X in a category C is a functor from G viewed as a category with a single object to C that maps the single object to X. Note this functor then induces a group homomorphism $G \to \operatorname{Aut}(X)$; cf. Automorphism group#In category theory.) of the symmetric group $\mathbb{S}_n$.

The category of combinatorial species is equivalent to the category of finite $\mathbb{S}$-sets (roughly because the permutation category is equivalent to the category of finite sets and bijections.)

== S-module ==
By $\mathbb{S}$-module, we mean an $\mathbb{S}$-object in the category $\mathsf{Vect}$ of finite-dimensional vector spaces over a field k of characteristic zero (the symmetric groups act from the right by convention). Then each $\mathbb{S}$-module determines a Schur functor on $\mathsf{Vect}$.

This definition of $\mathbb{S}$-module shares its name with the considerably better-known model for highly structured ring spectra due to Elmendorf, Kriz, Mandell and May.

== See also ==
- Highly structured ring spectrum
