= Suspension of a ring =

In algebra, more specifically in algebraic K-theory, the suspension $\Sigma R$ of a ring R is given by $\Sigma(R) = C(R)/M(R)$ where $C(R)$ is the ring of all infinite matrices with entries in R having only finitely many nonzero elements in each row or column and $M(R)$ is its ideal of matrices having only finitely many nonzero elements. It is an analog of suspension in topology.

One then has: $K_i(R) \simeq K_{i+1}(\Sigma R)$.
