= Mapping spectrum =

In algebraic topology, the mapping spectrum $F(X, Y)$ of spectra X, Y is characterized by

$[X \wedge Y, Z] = [X, F(Y, Z)].$
