= Alfred Frölicher =

Swiss mathematician

Alfred Frölicher (often misspelled Fröhlicher) was a Swiss mathematician (8 October 8 1927 – 1 July 2010). He was a full professor at the Université de Fribourg (1962–1965), and then at the Université de Genève (1966–1993). He introduced the Frölicher spectral sequence, the Frölicher–Nijenhuis bracket, Frölicher spaces and Frölicher groups.

He received his Ph.D. from ETH Zurich in 1954, with thesis Zur Differentialgeometrie der komplexe Strukturen written under the direction of Beno Eckmann and Heinz Hopf.

== Publications ==
- Bucher, W.; Frölicher, Alfred (1966), Calculus in vector spaces without norm, Lecture Notes in Mathematics, vol. 30, Berlin, New York: Springer-Verlag, ISBN 978-1-399-86684-2, MR 0213869
- Faure, Claude-Alain; Frölicher, Alfred (2000), Modern projective geometry, Mathematics and its Applications, vol. 521, Boston: Kluwer Academic Publishers, ISBN 978-0-7923-6525-9, MR 1783451
- Frölicher, Alfred; Kriegl, Andreas (1988), Linear spaces and differentiation theory, Pure and Applied Mathematics (New York), John Wiley & Sons, ISBN 978-0-471-91786-1, MR 0961256
