= Hochschild homology =

Theory for associative algebras over rings

In mathematics, Hochschild homology (and cohomology) is a homology theory for associative algebras over rings. There is also a theory for Hochschild homology of certain functors. Hochschild cohomology was introduced by Gerhard Hochschild (1945) for algebras over a field, and extended to algebras over more general rings by Henri Cartan and Samuel Eilenberg (1956).

== Definition of Hochschild homology of algebras ==
Let k be a field, A an associative k-algebra, and M an A-bimodule. The enveloping algebra of A is the tensor product $A^e=A\otimes A^o$ of A with its opposite algebra. Bimodules over A are essentially the same as modules over the enveloping algebra of A, so in particular A and M can be considered as A^{e}-modules. Cartan & Eilenberg (1956) defined the Hochschild homology and cohomology group of A with coefficients in M in terms of the Tor functor and Ext functor by

$$HH_n(A,M) = \operatorname{Tor}_n^{A^e}(A, M)$$
$$HH^n(A,M) = \operatorname{Ext}^n_{A^e}(A, M)$$

=== Hochschild complex ===
Let k be a ring, A an associative k-algebra that is a projective k-module, and M an A-bimodule. We will write $A^{\otimes n}$ for the n-fold tensor product of A over k. The chain complex that gives rise to Hochschild homology is given by

$$C_n(A,M) := M \otimes A^{\otimes n}$$

with boundary operator $d_i$ defined by

$$\begin{align}
d_0(m\otimes a_1 \otimes \cdots \otimes a_n) &= ma_1 \otimes a_2 \cdots \otimes a_n \\
d_i(m\otimes a_1 \otimes \cdots \otimes a_n) &= m\otimes a_1 \otimes \cdots \otimes a_i a_{i+1} \otimes \cdots \otimes a_n \\
d_n(m\otimes a_1 \otimes \cdots \otimes a_n) &= a_n m\otimes a_1 \otimes \cdots \otimes a_{n-1}
\end{align}$$

where $a_i$ is in A for all $1\le i\le n$ and $m\in M$. If we let

$$b_n=\sum_{i=0}^n (-1)^i d_i,$$

then $b_{n-1} \circ b_{n} =0$, so $(C_n(A,M),b_n)$ is a chain complex called the Hochschild complex, and its homology is the Hochschild homology of A with coefficients in M. Henceforth, we will write $b_n$ as simply $b$.

=== Remark ===
The maps $d_i$ are face maps making the family of modules $(C_n(A,M),b)$ a simplicial object in the category of k-modules, i.e., a functor Δ^{o} → k-mod, where Δ is the simplex category and k-mod is the category of k-modules. Here Δ^{o} is the opposite category of Δ. The degeneracy maps are defined by

$$s_i(a_0 \otimes \cdots \otimes a_n) = a_0 \otimes \cdots \otimes a_i \otimes 1 \otimes a_{i+1} \otimes \cdots \otimes a_n.$$

Hochschild homology is the homology of this simplicial module.

=== Relation with the bar complex ===
There is a similar looking complex $B(A/k)$ called the bar complex which formally looks very similar to the Hochschild complex^{pg 4-5}. In fact, the Hochschild complex $HH(A/k)$ can be recovered from the bar complex as
$$HH(A/k) \cong A\otimes_{A\otimes A^{op}} B(A/k)$$
giving an explicit isomorphism.

=== As a derived self-intersection ===
There's another useful interpretation of the Hochschild complex in the case of commutative rings, and more generally, for sheaves of commutative rings: it is constructed from the derived self-intersection of a scheme (or even derived scheme) $X$ over some base scheme $S$. For example, we can form the derived fiber product
$$X\times^\mathbf{L}_SX$$
which has the sheaf of derived rings $\mathcal{O}_X\otimes_{\mathcal{O}_S}^\mathbf{L}\mathcal{O}_X$. Then, if embed $X$ with the diagonal map
$$\Delta: X \to X\times^\mathbf{L}_SX$$
the Hochschild complex is constructed as the pullback of the derived self intersection of the diagonal in the diagonal product scheme
$$HH(X/S) := \Delta^*(\mathcal{O}_X\otimes_{\mathcal{O}_X\otimes_{\mathcal{O}_S}^\mathbf{L}\mathcal{O}_X}^\mathbf{L}\mathcal{O}_X)$$
From this interpretation, it should be clear the Hochschild homology should have some relation to the Kähler differentials $\Omega_{X/S}$ since the Kähler differentials can be defined using a self-intersection from the diagonal, or more generally, the cotangent complex $\mathbf{L}_{X/S}^\bullet$ since this is the derived replacement for the Kähler differentials. We can recover the original definition of the Hochschild complex of a commutative $k$-algebra $A$ by setting
$$S = \text{Spec}(k)$$
and
$$X = \text{Spec}(A)$$
Then, the Hochschild complex is quasi-isomorphic to
$$HH(A/k) \simeq_{qiso} A\otimes_{A\otimes_{k}^\mathbf{L}A}^\mathbf{L}A$$
If $A$ is a flat $k$-algebra, then there's the chain of isomorphisms
$$A\otimes_k^\mathbf{L}A \cong A\otimes_kA \cong A\otimes_kA^{op}$$
giving an alternative but equivalent presentation of the Hochschild complex.

== Hochschild homology of functors ==
The simplicial circle $S^1$ is a simplicial object in the category $\operatorname{Fin}_*$ of finite pointed sets, i.e., a functor $\Delta^o \to \operatorname{Fin}_*.$ Thus, if F is a functor $F\colon \operatorname{Fin} \to k\text{-mod}$, we get a simplicial module by composing F with $S^1$.

$$\Delta^o \overset{S^1}{\longrightarrow} \operatorname{Fin}_* \overset{F}{\longrightarrow} k\text{-mod}.$$

The homology of this simplicial module is the Hochschild homology of the functor F. The above definition of Hochschild homology of commutative algebras is the special case where F is the Loday functor.

=== Loday functor ===
A skeleton for the category of finite pointed sets is given by the objects

$$n_+ = \{0,1,\ldots,n\},$$

where 0 is the basepoint, and the morphisms are the basepoint preserving set maps. Let A be a commutative k-algebra and M be a symmetric A-bimodule. The Loday functor $L(A,M)$ is given on objects in $\operatorname{Fin}_*$ by

$$n_+ \mapsto M \otimes A^{\otimes n}.$$

A morphism

$$f:m_+ \to n_+$$

is sent to the morphism $f_*$ given by

$$f_*(a_0 \otimes \cdots \otimes a_m) = b_0 \otimes \cdots \otimes b_n$$

where

$$\forall j \in \{0, \ldots, n \}: \qquad b_j =
\begin{cases}
\prod_{i \in f^{-1}(j)} a_i & f^{-1}(j) \neq \emptyset\\
1 & f^{-1}(j) =\emptyset
\end{cases}$$

=== Another description of Hochschild homology of algebras ===
The Hochschild homology of a commutative algebra A with coefficients in a symmetric A-bimodule M is the homology associated to the composition

$$\Delta^o \overset{S^1}{\longrightarrow} \operatorname{Fin}_* \overset{\mathcal{L}(A,M)}{\longrightarrow} k\text{-mod},$$

and this definition agrees with the one above.

== Examples ==
The examples of Hochschild homology computations can be stratified into a number of distinct cases with fairly general theorems describing the structure of the homology groups and the homology ring $HH_*(A)$ for an associative algebra $A$. For the case of commutative algebras, there are a number of theorems describing the computations over characteristic 0 yielding a straightforward understanding of what the homology and cohomology compute.

=== Commutative characteristic 0 case ===
In the case of commutative algebras $A/k$ where $\mathbb{Q}\subseteq k$, the Hochschild homology has two main theorems concerning smooth algebras, and more general non-flat algebras $A$; but, the second is a direct generalization of the first. In the smooth case, i.e. for a smooth algebra $A$, the Hochschild-Kostant-Rosenberg theorem^{pg 43-44} states there is an isomorphism
$$\Omega^n_{A/k} \cong HH_n(A/k)$$
for every $n \geq 0$. This isomorphism can be described explicitly using the anti-symmetrization map. That is, a differential $n$-form has the map
$$a\,db_1\wedge \cdots \wedge db_n \mapsto
\sum_{\sigma \in S_n}\operatorname{sign}(\sigma)
a\otimes b_{\sigma(1)}\otimes \cdots \otimes b_{\sigma(n)}.$$
If the algebra $A/k$ isn't smooth, or even flat, then there is an analogous theorem using the cotangent complex. For a simplicial resolution $P_\bullet \to A$, we set $\mathbb{L}^i_{A/k} = \Omega^i_{P_\bullet/k}\otimes_{P_\bullet} A$. Then, there exists a descending $\mathbb{N}$-filtration $F_\bullet$ on $HH_n(A/k)$ whose graded pieces are isomorphic to
$$\frac{F_i}{F_{i+1}} \cong \mathbb{L}^i_{A/k}[+i].$$
Note this theorem makes it accessible to compute the Hochschild homology not just for smooth algebras, but also for local complete intersection algebras. In this case, given a presentation $A = R/I$ for $R = k[x_1,\dotsc,x_n]$, the cotangent complex is the two-term complex $I/I^2 \to \Omega^1_{R/k}\otimes_k A$.

==== Polynomial rings over the rationals ====
One simple example is to compute the Hochschild homology of a polynomial ring of $\mathbb{Q}$ with $n$-generators. The HKR theorem gives the isomorphism
$$HH_*(\mathbb{Q}[x_1,\ldots, x_n]) = \mathbb{Q}[x_1,\ldots, x_n]\otimes \Lambda(dx_1,\dotsc, dx_n)$$
where the algebra $\bigwedge(dx_1,\ldots, dx_n)$ is the free antisymmetric algebra over $\mathbb{Q}$ in $n$-generators. Its product structure is given by the wedge product of vectors, so
$$\begin{align}
dx_i\cdot dx_j &= -dx_j\cdot dx_i \\
dx_i\cdot dx_i &= 0
\end{align}$$
for $i \neq j$.

=== Commutative characteristic p case ===
In the characteristic p case, there is a userful counter-example to the Hochschild-Kostant-Rosenberg theorem which elucidates for the need of a theory beyond simplicial algebras for defining Hochschild homology. Consider the $\mathbb{Z}$-algebra $\mathbb{F}_p$. We can compute a resolution of $\mathbb{F}_p$ as the free differential graded algebras
$$\mathbb{Z}\xrightarrow{\cdot p} \mathbb{Z}$$
giving the derived intersection $\mathbb{F}_p\otimes^\mathbf{L}_\mathbb{Z}\mathbb{F}_p \cong \mathbb{F}_p[\varepsilon]/(\varepsilon^2)$ where $\text{deg}(\varepsilon) = 1$ and the differential is the zero map. This is because we just tensor the complex above by $\mathbb{F}_p$, giving a formal complex with a generator in degree $1$ which squares to $0$. Then, the Hochschild complex is given by
$$\mathbb{F}_p\otimes^\mathbb{L}_{\mathbb{F}_p\otimes^\mathbb{L}_\mathbb{Z} \mathbb{F}_p}\mathbb{F}_p$$
In order to compute this, we must resolve $\mathbb{F}_p$ as an $\mathbb{F}_p\otimes^\mathbf{L}_\mathbb{Z}\mathbb{F}_p$-algebra. Observe that the algebra structure

$\mathbb{F}_p[\varepsilon]/(\varepsilon^2) \to \mathbb{F}_p$

forces $\varepsilon \mapsto 0$. This gives the degree zero term of the complex. Then, because we have to resolve the kernel $\varepsilon \cdot \mathbb{F}_p\otimes^\mathbf{L}_\mathbb{Z}\mathbb{F}_p$, we can take a copy of $\mathbb{F}_p\otimes^\mathbf{L}_\mathbb{Z}\mathbb{F}_p$ shifted in degree $2$ and have it map to $\varepsilon \cdot \mathbb{F}_p\otimes^\mathbf{L}_\mathbb{Z}\mathbb{F}_p$, with kernel in degree $3$$\varepsilon \cdot \mathbb{F}_p\otimes^\mathbf{L}_\mathbb{Z}\mathbb{F}_p = \text{Ker}({\displaystyle \mathbb {F} _{p}\otimes _{\mathbb {Z} }^{\mathbf {L} }\mathbb {F} _{p}} \to {\displaystyle \varepsilon \cdot \mathbb {F} _{p}\otimes _{\mathbb {Z} }^{\mathbf {L} }\mathbb {F} _{p}}).$We can perform this recursively to get the underlying module of the divided power algebra
$$(\mathbb{F}_p\otimes^\mathbf{L}_\mathbb{Z}\mathbb{F}_p)\langle x \rangle =
\frac{
(\mathbb{F}_p\otimes^\mathbf{L}_\mathbb{Z}\mathbb{F}_p)[x_1,x_2,\ldots]
}{x_ix_j = \binom{i+j}{i}x_{i+j}}$$
with $dx_i = \varepsilon\cdot x_{i-1}$ and the degree of $x_i$ is $2i$, namely $|x_i| = 2i$. Tensoring this algebra with $\mathbb{F}_p$ over $\mathbb{F}_p\otimes^\mathbf{L}_\mathbb{Z}\mathbb{F}_p$ gives
$$HH_*(\mathbb{F}_p) = \mathbb{F}_p\langle x \rangle$$
since $\varepsilon$ multiplied with any element in $\mathbb{F}_p$ is zero. The algebra structure comes from general theory on divided power algebras and differential graded algebras. Note this computation is seen as a technical artifact because the ring $\mathbb{F}_p\langle x \rangle$ is not well behaved. For instance, $x^p = 0$. One technical response to this problem is through Topological Hochschild homology, where the base ring $\mathbb{Z}$ is replaced by the sphere spectrum $\mathbb{S}$.

== Topological Hochschild homology ==
The above construction of the Hochschild complex can be adapted to more general situations, namely by replacing the category of (complexes of) $k$-modules by an ∞-category (equipped with a tensor product) $\mathcal{C}$, and $A$ by an associative algebra in this category. Applying this to the category $\mathcal{C}=\textbf{Spectra}$ of spectra, and $A$ being the Eilenberg–MacLane spectrum associated to an ordinary ring $R$ yields topological Hochschild homology, denoted $THH(R)$. The (non-topological) Hochschild homology introduced above can be reinterpreted along these lines, by taking for $\mathcal{C} = D(\mathbb{Z})$ the derived category of $\Z$-modules (as an ∞-category).

Replacing tensor products over the sphere spectrum by tensor products over $\Z$ (or the Eilenberg–MacLane-spectrum $H\Z$) leads to a natural comparison map $THH(R) \to HH(R)$. It induces an isomorphism on homotopy groups in degrees 0, 1, and 2. In general, however, they are different, and $THH$ tends to yield simpler groups than HH. For example,

$$THH(\mathbb{F}_p) = \mathbb{F}_p[x],$$
$$HH(\mathbb{F}_p) = \mathbb{F}_p\langle x \rangle$$

is the polynomial ring (with x in degree 2), compared to the ring of divided powers in one variable.

Lars Hesselholt (2016) showed that the Hasse–Weil zeta function of a smooth proper variety over $\mathbb{F}_p$ can be expressed using regularized determinants involving topological Hochschild homology.

== See also ==
- Cyclic homology
