= Deligne cohomology =

In mathematics, Deligne cohomology, sometimes called Deligne-Beilinson cohomology, is the hypercohomology of the Deligne complex of a complex manifold. It was introduced by Pierre Deligne in unpublished work in about 1972 as a cohomology theory for algebraic varieties that includes both ordinary cohomology and intermediate Jacobians.

For introductory accounts of Deligne cohomology, see Brylinski (2008, section 1.5), Esnault & Viehweg (1988), and Gomi (2009, section 2).

== Definition ==
The analytic Deligne complex Z(p)_{D, an} on a complex analytic manifold X is

$0\rightarrow \mathbf Z(p)\rightarrow \Omega^0_X\rightarrow \Omega^1_X\rightarrow\cdots\rightarrow \Omega_X^{p-1} \rightarrow 0 \rightarrow \dots$

where Z(p) = (2π i)^{p}Z. Depending on the context, $\Omega^*_X$ is either the complex of smooth (i.e., C^{∞}) differential forms or of holomorphic forms, respectively. The Deligne cohomology H q
D,an (X,Z(p)) is the q-th hypercohomology of the Deligne complex. An alternative definition of this complex is given as the homotopy limit of the diagram

$$\begin{matrix}
& & \mathbb{Z} \\
& & \downarrow \\
\Omega_X^{\bullet \geq p} & \to & \Omega_X^\bullet
\end{matrix}$$

== Properties ==
Deligne cohomology groups H q
D (X,Z(p)) can be described geometrically, especially in low degrees. For p = 0, it agrees with the q-th singular cohomology group (with Z-coefficients), by definition. For q = 2 and p = 1, it is isomorphic to the group of isomorphism classes of smooth (or holomorphic, depending on the context) principal C^{×}-bundles over X. For p = q = 2, it is the group of isomorphism classes of C^{×}-bundles with connection. For q = 3 and p = 2 or 3, descriptions in terms of gerbes are available (Brylinski (2008)). This has been generalized to a description in higher degrees in terms of iterated classifying spaces and connections on them (Gajer (1997)).

=== Relation with Hodge classes ===
Recall there is a subgroup $\text{Hdg}^p(X) \subset H^{p,p}(X)$ of integral cohomology classes in $H^{2p}(X)$ called the group of Hodge classes. There is a short exact sequence relating Deligne-cohomology, their intermediate Jacobians, and this group of Hodge classes, namely

$0 \to J^{2p-1}(X) \to H^{2p}_\mathcal{D}(X,\mathbb{Z}(p)) \to \text{Hdg}^{2p}(X) \to 0.$

== Applications ==
Deligne cohomology is used to formulate Beilinson conjectures on special values of L-functions.

== Extensions ==
There is an extension of Deligne-cohomology defined for any symmetric spectrum $E$ where $\pi_i(E)\otimes \mathbb{C} = 0$ for $i$ odd which can be compared with ordinary Deligne cohomology on complex analytic varieties.

== See also ==
- Bundle gerbe
- Motivic cohomology
- Hodge structure
- Intermediate Jacobian
