= Bar complex =

Technique for constructing resolutions in homological algebra

In mathematics, the bar complex, also called the bar resolution, bar construction, standard resolution, or standard complex, is a way of constructing resolutions in homological algebra. It was first introduced for the special case of algebras over a commutative ring by Samuel Eilenberg and Saunders Mac Lane, and has since been generalized in many ways. The name "bar complex" comes from the fact that Eilenberg and Mac Lane used a vertical bar | as a shortened form of the tensor product $\otimes$ in their notation for the complex.

== Definition ==
Let $R$ be an algebra over a field $k$, let $M_1$ be a right $R$-module, and let $M_2$ be a left $R$-module. Then, one can form the bar complex $\operatorname{Bar}_R(M_1,M_2)$ given by

$$\cdots\rightarrow M_1 \otimes_k R \otimes_k R \otimes_k M_2 \rightarrow M_1 \otimes_k R \otimes_k M_2 \rightarrow M_1 \otimes_k M_2 \rightarrow 0\,,$$

with the differential

$$\begin{align}
d(m_1 \otimes r_1 \otimes \cdots \otimes r_n \otimes m_2) &= m_1 r_1 \otimes \cdots \otimes r_n \otimes m_2 \\
&+ \sum_{i=1}^{n-1} (-1)^i m_1 \otimes r_1 \otimes \cdots \otimes r_i r_{i+1} \otimes \cdots \otimes r_n \otimes m_2 + (-1)^n m_1 \otimes r_1 \otimes \cdots \otimes r_n m_2
\end{align}$$

== Resolutions ==
The bar complex is useful because it provides a canonical way of producing (free) resolutions of modules over a ring. However, often these resolutions are very large, and can be prohibitively difficult to use for performing actual computations.

=== Free resolution of a module ===
Let $M$ be a left $R$-module, with $R$ a unital $k$-algebra. Then, the bar complex $\operatorname{Bar}_R(R,M)$ gives a resolution of $M$ by free left $R$-modules. Explicitly, the complex is

$$\cdots\rightarrow R \otimes_k R \otimes_k R \otimes_k M \rightarrow R \otimes_k R \otimes_k M \rightarrow R \otimes_k M \rightarrow 0\,,$$

This complex is composed of free left $R$-modules, since each subsequent term is obtained by taking the free left $R$-module on the underlying vector space of the previous term.

To see that this gives a resolution of $M$, consider the modified complex

$$\cdots\rightarrow R \otimes_k R \otimes_k R \otimes_k M \rightarrow R \otimes_k R \otimes_k M \rightarrow R \otimes_k M \rightarrow M \rightarrow 0\,,$$

Then, the above bar complex being a resolution of $M$ is equivalent to this extended complex having trivial homology. One can show this by constructing an explicit homotopy $h_n : R^{\otimes_k n} \otimes_k M \to R^{\otimes_k (n+1)} \otimes_k M$ between the identity and 0. This homotopy is given by

$$\begin{align}
h_n(r_1 \otimes \cdots \otimes r_n \otimes m) &= \sum_{i=1}^{n-1} (-1)^{i+1} r_1 \otimes \cdots \otimes r_{i-1} \otimes 1 \otimes r_i \otimes \cdots \otimes r_n \otimes m
\end{align}$$

One can similarly construct a resolution of a right $R$-module $N$ by free right modules with the complex $\operatorname{Bar}_R(N,R)$.

Notice that, in the case one wants to resolve $R$ as a module over itself, the above two complexes are the same, and actually give a resolution of $R$ by $R$-$R$-bimodules. This provides one with a slightly smaller resolution of $R$ by free $R$-$R$-bimodules than the naive option $\operatorname{Bar}_{R^e}(R^e,M)$. Here we are using the equivalence between $R$-$R$-bimodules and $R^e$-modules, where $R^e = R \otimes R^\operatorname{op}$, see bimodules for more details.

== Normalized bar complex ==
The normalized (or reduced) standard complex replaces $A\otimes A\otimes \cdots \otimes A\otimes A$ with $A\otimes(A/K) \otimes \cdots \otimes (A/K)\otimes A$.

== See also ==
- Koszul complex
