= Ring spectrum =

In stable homotopy theory, a ring spectrum is a spectrum E together with a multiplication map

μ: E ∧ E → E

and a unit map

η: S → E,

where S is the sphere spectrum. These maps have to satisfy associativity and unitality conditions up to homotopy, much in the same way as the multiplication of a ring is associative and unital. That is,

μ (id ∧ μ) ~ μ (μ ∧ id)

and

μ (id ∧ η) ~ id ~ μ(η ∧ id).

Examples of ring spectra include singular homology with coefficients in a ring, complex cobordism, K-theory, and Morava K-theory.

== See also ==
- Highly structured ring spectrum
