= Spectrum (topology) =

Mathematical object

In algebraic topology, a branch of mathematics, a spectrum is an object representing a generalized cohomology theory. Every such cohomology theory is representable, as follows from Brown's representability theorem. This means that, given a cohomology theory

$\mathcal{E}^*:\text{CW}^{op} \to \text{Ab}$,

there exist spaces $E^k$ such that evaluating the cohomology theory in degree $k$ on a space $X$ is equivalent to computing the homotopy classes of maps to the space $E^k$, that is

$\mathcal{E}^k(X) \cong \left[X, E^k\right]$.

Note there are several different categories of spectra leading to many technical difficulties, but they all determine the same homotopy category, known as the stable homotopy category. This is one of the key points for introducing spectra because they form a natural home for stable homotopy theory.

== The definition of a spectrum ==
There are many variations of the definition: in general, a spectrum is any sequence $X_n$ of pointed topological spaces or pointed simplicial sets together with the structure maps $S^1 \wedge X_n \to X_{n+1}$, where $\wedge$ is the smash product. The smash product of a pointed space $X$ with a circle is homeomorphic to the reduced suspension of $X$, denoted $\Sigma X$.

The following is due to Frank Adams (1974): a spectrum (or CW-spectrum) is a sequence $E:= \{E_n\}_{n\in \mathbb{N}}$ of CW complexes together with inclusions $\Sigma E_n \to E_{n+1}$ of the suspension $\Sigma E_n$ as a subcomplex of $E_{n+1}$.

For other definitions, see symmetric spectrum and simplicial spectrum.

=== Homotopy groups of a spectrum ===
Some of the most important invariants of a spectrum are its homotopy groups. These groups mirror the definition of the stable homotopy groups of spaces since the structure of the suspension maps is integral in its definition. Given a spectrum $E$ define the homotopy group $\pi_n(E)$ as the colimit

$$\begin{align}
\pi_n(E) &= \lim_{\to k} \pi_{n+k}(E_k) \\
&= \lim_\to \left(\cdots \to \pi_{n+k}(E_k) \to \pi_{n+k+1}(E_{k+1}) \to \cdots\right)
\end{align}$$

where the maps are induced from the composition of the map $\Sigma: \pi_{n+k}(E_n) \to \pi_{n+k+1}(\Sigma E_n)$ (that is, $[S^{n+k}, E_n] \to [S^{n+k+1}, \Sigma E_n]$ given by functoriality of $\Sigma$) and the structure map $\Sigma E_n \to E_{n+1}$. A spectrum is said to be connective if its $\pi_k$ are zero for negative k.

== Examples ==
=== Eilenberg–Maclane spectrum ===
Consider singular cohomology $H^n(X;A)$ with coefficients in an abelian group $A$. For a CW complex $X$, the group $H^n(X;A)$ can be identified with the set of homotopy classes of maps from $X$ to $K(A,n)$, the Eilenberg–MacLane space with homotopy concentrated in degree $n$. We write this as

$[X,K(A,n)] = H^n(X;A)$

Then the corresponding spectrum $HA$ has $n$-th space $K(A,n)$; it is called the Eilenberg–MacLane spectrum of $A$. Note this construction can be used to embed any ring $R$ into the category of spectra. One of the important properties of this embedding are the isomorphisms

$$\begin{align}
\pi_i( H(R/I) \wedge_R H(R/J) ) &\cong H_i\left(R/I\otimes^{\mathbf{L}}R/J\right)\\
&\cong \operatorname{Tor}_i^R(R/I,R/J)
\end{align}$$

showing the category of spectra keeps track of the derived information of commutative rings, where the smash product acts as the derived tensor product. Moreover, Eilenberg–Maclane spectra can be used to define theories such as topological Hochschild homology for commutative rings, a more refined theory than classical Hochschild homology.

=== Topological complex K-theory ===
As a second important example, consider topological K-theory. At least for X compact, $K^0(X)$ is defined to be the Grothendieck group of the monoid of complex vector bundles on X. Also, $K^1(X)$ is the group corresponding to vector bundles on the suspension of X. Topological K-theory is a generalized cohomology theory, so it gives a spectrum. The zeroth space is $\mathbb{Z} \times BU$ while the first space is $U$. Here $U$ is the infinite unitary group and $BU$ is its classifying space. By Bott periodicity we get $K^{2n}(X) \cong K^0(X)$ and $K^{2n+1}(X) \cong K^1(X)$ for all n, so all the spaces in the topological K-theory spectrum are given by either $\mathbb{Z} \times BU$ or $U$. There is a corresponding construction using real vector bundles instead of complex vector bundles, which gives an 8-periodic spectrum.

=== Sphere spectrum ===
One of the quintessential examples of a spectrum is the sphere spectrum $\mathbb{S}$. This is a spectrum whose homotopy groups are given by the stable homotopy groups of spheres, so

$\pi_n(\mathbb{S}) = \pi_n^{\mathbb{S}}$

We can write down this spectrum explicitly as $\mathbb{S}_i = S^i$ where $\mathbb{S}_0 = \{0, 1\}$. Note the smash product gives a product structure on this spectrum

$S^n \wedge S^m \simeq S^{n+m}$

induces a ring structure on $\mathbb{S}$. Moreover, if considering the category of symmetric spectra, this forms the initial object, analogous to $\mathbb{Z}$ in the category of commutative rings.

=== Thom spectra ===
Another canonical example of spectra come from the Thom spectra representing various cobordism theories. This includes real cobordism $MO$, complex cobordism $MU$, framed cobordism, spin cobordism $MSpin$, string cobordism $MString$, and so on. In fact, for any topological group $G$ there is a Thom spectrum $MG$.

=== Suspension spectrum ===
A spectrum may be constructed out of a space. The suspension spectrum of a space $X$, denoted $\Sigma^\infty X$ is a spectrum $X_n = S^n \wedge X$ (the structure maps are the identity.) For example, the suspension spectrum of the 0-sphere is the sphere spectrum discussed above. The homotopy groups of this spectrum are then the stable homotopy groups of $X$, so

$\pi_n(\Sigma^\infty X) = \pi_n^\mathbb{S}(X)$

The construction of the suspension spectrum implies every space can be considered as a cohomology theory. In fact, it defines a functor

$\Sigma^\infty:h\text{CW} \to h\text{Spectra}$

from the homotopy category of CW complexes to the homotopy category of spectra. The morphisms are given by

$[\Sigma^\infty X, \Sigma^\infty Y] = \underset{\to n}{\operatorname{colim}{}}[\Sigma^nX,\Sigma^nY]$

which by the Freudenthal suspension theorem eventually stabilizes. By this we mean

$\left[\Sigma^N X, \Sigma^N Y\right] \simeq \left[\Sigma^{N+1} X, \Sigma^{N+1} Y\right] \simeq \cdots$ and $\left[\Sigma^\infty X, \Sigma^\infty Y\right] \simeq \left[\Sigma^N X, \Sigma^N Y\right]$

for some finite integer $N$. For a spectrum $E$ there is an inverse construction $\Omega^\infty$ which forms a space

$\Omega^\infty E = \underset{\to n}{\operatorname{colim}{}}\Omega^n E_n$

called the infinite loop space of the spectrum. For a CW complex $X$

$\Omega^\infty\Sigma^\infty X = \underset{\to}{\operatorname{colim}{}} \Omega^n\Sigma^nX$

and this construction comes with an inclusion $X \to \Omega^n\Sigma^n X$ for every $n$, hence gives a map

$X \to \Omega^\infty\Sigma^\infty X$

which is injective. Unfortunately, these two structures, with the addition of the smash product, lead to significant complexity in the theory of spectra because there cannot exist a single category of spectra which satisfies a list of five axioms relating these structures. The above adjunction is valid only in the homotopy categories of spaces and spectra, but not always with a specific category of spectra (not the homotopy category).

=== Ω-spectrum ===
An Ω-spectrum is a spectrum such that the adjoint of the structure map (i.e., the map$X_n \to \Omega X_{n+1}$) is a weak equivalence. The K-theory spectrum of a ring is an example of an Ω-spectrum.

=== Ring spectrum ===
A ring spectrum is a spectrum X such that the diagrams that describe ring axioms in terms of smash products commute "up to homotopy" ($S^0 \to X$ corresponds to the identity.) For example, the spectrum of topological K-theory is a ring spectrum. A module spectrum may be defined analogously.

For many more examples, see the list of cohomology theories.

== Functions, maps, and homotopies of spectra ==
There are three natural categories whose objects are spectra, whose morphisms are the functions, or maps, or homotopy classes defined below.

A function between two spectra E and F is a sequence of maps from E_{n} to F_{n} that commute with the maps ΣE_{n} → E_{n+1} and ΣF_{n} → F_{n+1}.

Given a spectrum $E_n$, a subspectrum $F_n$ is a sequence of subcomplexes that is also a spectrum. As each i-cell in $E_j$ suspends to an (i + 1)-cell in $E_{j+1}$, a cofinal subspectrum is a subspectrum for which each cell of the parent spectrum is eventually contained in the subspectrum after a finite number of suspensions. Spectra can then be turned into a category by defining a map of spectra $f: E \to F$ to be a function from a cofinal subspectrum $G$ of $E$ to $F$, where two such functions represent the same map if they coincide on some cofinal subspectrum. Intuitively such a map of spectra does not need to be everywhere defined, just eventually become defined, and two maps that coincide on a cofinal subspectrum are said to be equivalent. This gives the category of spectra (and maps), which is a major tool. There is a natural embedding of the category of pointed CW complexes into this category: it takes $Y$ to the suspension spectrum in which the nth complex is $\Sigma^n Y$.

The smash product of a spectrum $E$ and a pointed complex $X$ is a spectrum given by $(E \wedge X)_n = E_n \wedge X$ (associativity of the smash product yields immediately that this is indeed a spectrum). A homotopy of maps between spectra corresponds to a map $(E \wedge I^+) \to F$, where $I^+$ is the disjoint union $[0, 1] \sqcup \{*\}$ with $*$ taken to be the basepoint.

The stable homotopy category, or homotopy category of (CW) spectra is defined to be the category whose objects are spectra and whose morphisms are homotopy classes of maps between spectra. Many other definitions of spectrum, some appearing very different, lead to equivalent stable homotopy categories.

Finally, we can define the suspension of a spectrum by $(\Sigma E)_n = E_{n+1}$. This translation suspension is invertible, as we can desuspend too, by setting $(\Sigma^{-1}E)_n = E_{n-1}$.

== The triangulated homotopy category of spectra ==
The stable homotopy category is additive: maps can be added by using a variant of the track addition used to define homotopy groups. Thus homotopy classes from one spectrum to another form an abelian group. Furthermore the stable homotopy category is triangulated (Vogt (1970)), the shift being given by suspension and the distinguished triangles by the mapping cone sequences of spectra

$$X\rightarrow Y\rightarrow Y\cup CX \rightarrow (Y\cup CX)\cup CY \cong \Sigma X$$.

== Smash products of spectra ==
The smash product of spectra extends the smash product of CW complexes. It makes the stable homotopy category into a monoidal category; in other words it behaves like the (derived) tensor product of abelian groups. A major problem with the smash product is that obvious ways of defining it make it associative and commutative only up to homotopy. Some more recent definitions of spectra, such as symmetric spectra, eliminate this problem, and give a symmetric monoidal structure at the level of maps, before passing to homotopy classes.

The smash product is compatible with the triangulated category structure. In particular the smash product of a distinguished triangle with a spectrum is a distinguished triangle.

== Generalized homology and cohomology of spectra ==
We can define the (stable) homotopy groups of a spectrum to be those given by

$$\displaystyle \pi_n E = [\Sigma^n \mathbb{S}, E]$$,

where $\mathbb{S}$ is the sphere spectrum and $[X, Y]$ is the set of homotopy classes of maps from $X$ to $Y$. We define the generalized homology theory of a spectrum E by

$$E_n X = \pi_n (E \wedge X) = [\Sigma^n \mathbb{S}, E \wedge X]$$

and define its generalized cohomology theory by

$$\displaystyle E^n X = [\Sigma^{-n} X, E].$$

Here $X$ can be a spectrum or (by using its suspension spectrum) a space.

== Technical complexities with spectra ==
One of the canonical complexities while working with spectra and defining a category of spectra comes from the fact each of these categories cannot satisfy five seemingly obvious axioms concerning the infinite loop space of a spectrum $Q$

$Q: \text{Top}_* \to \text{Top}_*$

sending

$QX = \mathop{\text{colim}}_{\to n}\Omega^n\Sigma^n X$

, a pair of adjoint functors $\Sigma^\infty: \text{Top}_* \leftrightarrows \text{Spectra}_* : \Omega^\infty$, and the smash product $\wedge$ in both the category of spaces and the category of spectra. If we let $\text{Top}_*$ denote the category of based, compactly generated, weak Hausdorff spaces, and $\text{Spectra}_*$ denote a category of spectra, the following five axioms can never be satisfied by the specific model of spectra:

1. $\text{Spectra}_*$ is a symmetric monoidal category with respect to the smash product $\wedge$
2. The functor $\Sigma^\infty$ is left-adjoint to $\Omega^\infty$
3. The unit for the smash product $\wedge$ is the sphere spectrum $\Sigma^\infty S^0 = \mathbb{S}$
4. Either there is a natural transformation $\phi: \left(\Omega^\infty E\right) \wedge \left(\Omega^\infty E'\right) \to \Omega^\infty\left(E \wedge E'\right)$ or a natural transformation $\gamma: \left(\Sigma^\infty E\right) \wedge \left(\Sigma^\infty E'\right) \to \Sigma^\infty\left(E \wedge E'\right)$ which commutes with the unit object in both categories, and the commutative and associative isomorphisms in both categories.
5. There is a natural weak equivalence $\theta: \Omega^\infty\Sigma^\infty X \to QX$ for $X \in \operatorname{Ob}(\text{Top}_*)$ which means that there is a commuting diagram:
  $$\begin{matrix}
X & \xrightarrow{\eta} & \Omega^\infty\Sigma^\infty X \\
\mathord{=} \downarrow & & \downarrow \theta \\
X & \xrightarrow{i} & QX
\end{matrix}$$
  where $\eta$ is the unit map in the adjunction.

Because of this, the study of spectra is fractured based upon the model being used. For an overview, check out the article cited above.

== History ==
A version of the concept of a spectrum was introduced in the 1958 doctoral dissertation of Elon Lages Lima. His advisor Edwin Spanier wrote further on the subject in 1959. Spectra were adopted by Michael Atiyah and George W. Whitehead in their work on generalized homology theories in the early 1960s. The 1964 doctoral thesis of J. Michael Boardman gave a workable definition of a category of spectra and of maps (not just homotopy classes) between them, as useful in stable homotopy theory as the category of CW complexes is in the unstable case. (This is essentially the category described above, and it is still used for many purposes: for other accounts, see Adams (1974) or Rainer Vogt (1970).) Important further theoretical advances have however been made since 1990, improving vastly the formal properties of spectra. Consequently, much recent literature uses modified definitions of spectrum: see Michael Mandell et al. (2001) for a unified treatment of these new approaches.

== See also ==
- Ring spectrum
- Symmetric spectrum
- G-spectrum
- Mapping spectrum
- Suspension (topology)
- Adams spectral sequence
