= Smash product =

Combination of pointed topological spaces

In topology, a branch of mathematics, the smash product of two pointed spaces (i.e. topological spaces with distinguished basepoints) (X, x_{0}) and (Y, y_{0}) is the quotient of the product space X × Y under the identifications (x, y_{0}) ~ (x_{0}, y) for all x in X and y in Y. The smash product is itself a pointed space, with basepoint being the equivalence class of (x_{0}, y_{0}). The smash product is usually denoted X ∧ Y or X ⨳ Y. The smash product depends on the choice of basepoints (unless both X and Y are homogeneous).

One can think of X and Y as sitting inside X × Y as the subspaces X × {y_{0}} and {x_{0}} × Y. These subspaces intersect at a single point: (x_{0}, y_{0}), the basepoint of X × Y. So the union of these subspaces can be identified with the wedge sum $X \vee Y = (X \amalg Y) \; / {\sim}$. In particular, {x_{0}} × Y in X × Y is identified with Y in $X \vee Y$, ditto for X × {y_{0}} and X. In $X \vee Y$, subspaces X and Y intersect in the single point $x_0 \sim y_0$. The smash product is then the quotient
$$X \wedge Y = (X \times Y) / (X \vee Y).$$

The smash product shows up in homotopy theory, a branch of algebraic topology. In homotopy theory, one often works with a different category of spaces than the category of all topological spaces. In some of these categories the definition of the smash product must be modified slightly. For example, the smash product of two CW complexes is a CW complex if one uses the product of CW complexes in the definition rather than the product topology. Similar modifications are necessary in other categories.

== Examples ==
A visualization of $S^1 \wedge S^1$ as the quotient $(S^1\times S^1)/(S^1\vee S^1)$.

- The smash product of any pointed space X with a 0-sphere (a discrete space with two points) is homeomorphic to X.
- The smash product of two circles is a quotient of the torus homeomorphic to the 2-sphere. That is, it is the quotient space of the torus $(S^1\times S^1)$ by the figure-8 space $(S^1\vee S^1)$. This can be visualized by taking the union of the innermost line of latitude of the torus and a given line of longitude and assuming their intersection is the basepoint. The union of two circles intersecting at a point is homeomorphic to the figure-8 space, which is then collapsed to a single point, resulting in a quotient space homeomorphic to the 2-sphere (see diagram).
- More generally, the smash product of two spheres S^{m} and S^{n} is homeomorphic to the sphere S^{m+n}.
- The smash product of a space X with a circle is homeomorphic to the reduced suspension of X:
  $$\Sigma X \cong X \wedge S^1.$$
- The k-fold iterated reduced suspension of X is homeomorphic to the smash product of X and a k-sphere
  $$\Sigma^k X \cong X \wedge S^k.$$
- In domain theory, taking the product of two domains (so that the product is strict on its arguments).

== As a symmetric monoidal product ==
For any pointed spaces X, Y, and Z in an appropriate "convenient" category (e.g., that of compactly generated spaces), there are natural (basepoint preserving) homeomorphisms
$$\begin{align}
X \wedge Y &\cong Y\wedge X, \\
(X\wedge Y)\wedge Z &\cong X \wedge (Y\wedge Z).
\end{align}$$
However, for the naive category of pointed spaces, this fails, as shown by the counterexample $X=Y=\mathbb{Q}$ and $Z=\N$ found by Dieter Puppe. A proof due to Kathleen Lewis that Puppe's counterexample is indeed a counterexample can be found in the book of J. Peter May and Johann Sigurdsson.

These isomorphisms make the appropriate category of pointed spaces into a symmetric monoidal category with the smash product as the monoidal product and the pointed 0-sphere (a two-point discrete space) as the unit object. One can therefore think of the smash product as a kind of tensor product in an appropriate category of pointed spaces.

== Adjoint relationship ==
Adjoint functors make the analogy between the tensor product and the smash product more precise. In the category of R-modules over a commutative ring R, the tensor functor $(- \otimes_R A)$ is left adjoint to the internal Hom functor $\mathrm{Hom}(A,-)$, so that
$$\mathrm{Hom}(X\otimes A,Y) \cong \mathrm{Hom}(X,\mathrm{Hom}(A,Y)).$$
In the category of pointed spaces, the smash product plays the role of the tensor product in this formula: if $A, X$ are compact Hausdorff then we have an adjunction
$$\mathrm{Maps_*}(X\wedge A,Y) \cong \mathrm{Maps_*}(X,\mathrm{Maps_*}(A,Y))$$

where $\operatorname{Maps_*}$ denotes continuous maps that send basepoint to basepoint, and $\mathrm{Maps_*}(A,Y)$ carries the compact-open topology.

In particular, taking $A$ to be the unit circle $S^1$, we see that the reduced suspension functor $\Sigma$ is left adjoint to the loop space functor $\Omega$:
$$\mathrm{Maps_*}(\Sigma X,Y) \cong \mathrm{Maps_*}(X,\Omega Y).$$
