= Sphere spectrum =

Mathematical theory

In stable homotopy theory, a branch of mathematics, the sphere spectrum S is the monoidal unit in the category of spectra. It is the suspension spectrum of S^{0}, i.e., a set of two points. Explicitly, the n-th space in the sphere spectrum is the n-dimensional sphere S^{n}, and the structure maps from the suspension of S^{n} to S^{n+1} are the canonical homeomorphisms. The k-th homotopy group of a sphere spectrum is the k-th stable homotopy group of spheres.

The localization of the sphere spectrum at a prime number p is called the local sphere at p and is denoted by $S_{(p)}$.

== See also ==
- Chromatic homotopy theory
- Adams-Novikov spectral sequence
- Framed cobordism
