= Hiroshi Toda =

Japanese mathematician

- Born: January 1928; Japan
- Died: 26 February 2026 (aged 98); Japan
- Education: Osaka University
- Known for: Toda bracket Toda fibration Toda-Smith complex
- Awards: Asahi Prize (1958)
- Scientific career
- Fields: Mathematics
- Workplaces: Kyoto University
- Thesis: Complex of the standard paths and n-ad homotopy groups (1956)
- Doctoral advisor: Atuo Komatu

Hiroshi Toda (戸田 宏, Toda Hiroshi; January 1928 – 26 February 2026) was a Japanese mathematician, who specialized in stable and unstable homotopy theory.

He started publishing in 1952. Many of his early papers are concerned with the study of Whitehead products and their behaviour under suspension and more generally with the (unstable) homotopy groups of spheres. In a 1957 paper he showed the first non-existence result for the Hopf invariant 1 problem. This period of his work culminated in his book Composition methods in homotopy groups of spheres (1962). Here he used as important tools the Toda bracket (which he calls the toric construction) and the Toda fibration, among others, to compute the first 20 nontrivial homotopy groups for each sphere.

Among his most important contributions to stable homotopy theory was his work on the existence and non-existence of so-called Toda–Smith complexes. These are finite complexes which can be characterized as having a particularly simple ordinary homology (as modules over the Steenrod algebra) or, alternatively, by having a particularly simple BP-homology. They can be used to construct the Greek letter infinite families in the stable homotopy groups of spheres. In his paper On spectra realizing exterior parts of the Steenrod algebra (1971), Toda deduced several existence and non-existence results on these complexes. The existence parts are still unsurpassed.

Toda also did important work on the algebraic topology of (exceptional) Lie groups.
