= Secondary cohomology operation =

In mathematics, a secondary cohomology operation is a functorial correspondence between cohomology groups. More precisely, it is a natural transformation from the kernel of some primary cohomology operation to the cokernel of another primary operation. They were introduced by J. Frank Adams (1960) in his solution to the Hopf invariant problem. Similarly, one can define tertiary cohomology operations from the kernel to the cokernel of secondary operations, and continue in this manner to define higher cohomology operations, as noted by Maunder (1963).

Michael Atiyah pointed out in the 1960s that many of the classical applications could be proved more easily using generalized cohomology theories, such as in his reproof of the Hopf invariant one theorem. Despite this, secondary cohomology operations still see modern usage, for example, in the obstruction theory of commutative ring spectra.

Examples of secondary and higher cohomology operations include the Massey product, the Toda bracket, and differentials of spectral sequences.

== See also ==
- Peterson–Stein formula
