= Bernard Russell Gelbaum =

American mathematician

- Died: March 22, 2005; Laguna Beach, California
- Education: Columbia University, Princeton University
- Scientific career
- Fields: Mathematics
- Workplaces: University of Minnesota; University of California, Irvine; University at Buffalo
- Doctoral advisor: Salomon Bochner
- Doctoral students: Mark Mahowald; Robert Zink

Bernard Russell Gelbaum (died March 22, 2005, Laguna Beach, California) was a mathematician and academic administrator having served as a professor at the University of Minnesota, University of California, Irvine (where he was the first chair of the math department as well as acting dean and associate dean of physical sciences) and as well as emeritus professor in the Department of Mathematics, College of Arts and Sciences, University at Buffalo. When he arrived at Buffalo 1971, he served as vice president for academic affairs as well as being a math professor.

== Biography ==
While still an undergraduate at Columbia University, Gelbaum served as a second lieutenant in the U.S. Signal Corps and was one of the first to liberate the Buchenwald concentration camp. He went on to get his doctorate at Princeton University in 1948. His dissertation, Expansions in Banach Spaces, was supervised by Salomon Bochner.

== Selected publications ==
Throughout his career, Gelbaum authored or co-authored at least eight books, primarily focusing on real and complex analysis, linear algebra, and mathematical pedagogy. His most enduring work, Counterexamples in Analysis, remains a standard reference in mathematical education.

- Counterexamples in Analysis (with John M. H. Olmsted): Originally published by Holden-Day in 1964 and later reprinted by Dover Publications in 2003.
- Mathematics for the Social and Behavioral Sciences: Probability, Calculus and Statistics (with James G. March): Published by W. B. Saunders in 1969, applying mathematical rigor to the social sciences.
- Problems in Analysis: Published by Springer-Verlag in 1982 as part of the "Problem Books in Mathematics" series.
- Linear Algebra: Basics, Practice, and Theory: Published by Elsevier Science in 1988.
- Theorems and Counterexamples in Mathematics (with John M. H. Olmsted): Published by Springer-Verlag in 1990, expanding the counterexample approach to broader mathematical topics.
- Problems in Real and Complex Analysis: Published by Springer-Verlag in 1992, containing nearly 900 problems and solutions for graduate students.
- Modern Real and Complex Analysis: Published by Wiley-Interscience in 1995, a comprehensive advanced textbook.

== Academic genealogy and students ==
Gelbaum was an active doctoral advisor, supervising the research of 11 students across his tenure. According to the Mathematics Genealogy Project, he has over 200 academic descendants.

His notable students include:

- Mark Mahowald: A prominent algebraic topologist known for his work on homotopy groups of spheres.
- Robert Zink: Known for his contributions to mathematical analysis and education.
