= Michael Adams (RAF officer) =

Senior Royal Air Force officer (1934–2022)

Michael Keith Adams
- Born: 23 January 1934; Woolwich, London, England
- Died: 30 August 2022 (aged 88)
- Allegiance: United Kingdom
- Branch: Royal Air Force
- Service years: 1952–1988
- Rank: Air vice-marshal
- Awards: Companion of the Order of the Bath; Air Force Cross

Air vice-marshal Michael Keith Adams CB, AFC, FRAeS (23 January 1934 – 30 August 2022) was a senior Royal Air Force officer and test pilot.

== Biography ==
Born in 1934 in Woolwich, Michael Adams was educated at City of London School. He had an older brother, Frank Adams, who became an accomplished mathematician, known for the Adams spectral sequence, Adams operations and Adams conjecture. Michael joined the Royal Air Force in 1952. He became Air officer commanding Royal Air Force Training Units between 1983 and 1984, Assistant Chief of the Air Staff for Operational Requirements at the Ministry of Defence between 1984 and 1986, and Senior Directing Officer at the Royal College of Defence Studies between 1987 and 1988.

As a test pilot, he worked on the Tornado fighter, the Puma helicopter, and the European Fighter Aircraft (Eurofighter Typhoon). He was supposed to be one of two pilots to fly a Harrier jump jet in the 1969 Daily Mail Trans-Atlantic Air Race, but was injured before the competition when the nosewheel collapsed on a Harrier he was testing.

Adams was made a Companion of the Order of the Bath in the 1986 New Year Honours. He retired from the Royal Air Force in 1988.

Adams died on 30 August 2022, at the age of 88.
