= Mark Mahowald =

American mathematician (1931–2013)

- Born: December 1, 1931; Albany, Minnesota
- Died: July 20, 2013 (aged 81); Illinois, United States
- Education: University of Minnesota
- Known for: Homotopy groups of spheres
- Scientific career
- Fields: Mathematics
- Workplaces: Syracuse University; Northwestern University
- Doctoral advisor: Bernard Russell Gelbaum
- Doctoral students: Michael J. Hopkins, Zhouli Xu

Mark Edward Mahowald (December 1, 1931 – July 20, 2013) was an American mathematician known for work in algebraic topology.

== Life ==
Mahowald was born in Albany, Minnesota in 1931. He received his Ph.D. from the University of Minnesota in 1955 under the direction of Bernard Russell Gelbaum with a thesis on Measure in Groups. In the sixties, he became professor at Syracuse University and around 1963 he went to Northwestern University in Evanston, Illinois.

== Work ==
Much of Mahowald's most important works concerns the homotopy groups of spheres, especially using the Adams spectral sequence at the prime 2. He is known for constructing one of the first known infinite families of elements in the stable homotopy groups of spheres by showing that the classes $h_1h_j$ survive the Adams spectral sequence for $j\geq 3$. In addition, he made extensive computations of the structure of the Adams spectral sequence and the 2-primary stable homotopy groups of spheres up to dimension 64 together with Michael Barratt, Martin Tangora, and Stanley Kochman. Using these computations, he could show that a manifold of Kervaire invariant 1 exists in dimension 62.

In addition, he contributed to the chromatic picture of the homotopy groups of spheres: His earlier work contains much on the image of the J-homomorphism and recent work together with Paul Goerss, Hans-Werner Henn, Nasko Karamanov, and Charles Rezk does computations in stable homotopy localized at the Morava K-theory $K(2)$.

Besides the work on the homotopy groups of spheres and related spaces, he did important work on Thom spectra. This work was used heavily in the proof of the nilpotence theorem by Ethan Devinatz, Michael J. Hopkins, and Jeffrey Smith.

== Awards and honors ==
In 1998 he was an Invited Speaker of the International Congress of Mathematicians in Berlin. In 2012 he became a fellow of the American Mathematical Society.

== Selected publications ==
- Mark E. Mahowald and Martin C. Tangora, Some differentials in the Adams spectral sequence, Topology 6 (1967) 349–369. doi:10.1016/0040-9383(67)90023-7 MR 0214072
- Michael G. Barratt, Mark E. Mahowald, and Martin C. Tangora, Some differentials in the Adams spectral sequence II, Topology 9 (1970) 309–316. doi:10.1016/0040-9383(70)90055-8 MR 0266215
- Stanley O. Kochman and Mark E. Mahowald, On the computation of stable stems in The Čech centennial: a Conference on Homotopy Theory, June 22–26, 1993, pp. 299–316. MR 1320997
- Mark E. Mahowald, A new infinite family in $_2\pi_*^S$, Topology 16 (1977) 249–256. doi:10.1016/0040-9383(77)90005-2
- Paul Goerss, Hans-Werner Henn, Mark E. Mahowald, and Charles Rezk, A resolution of the K(2)-local sphere at the prime 3, Annals of Mathematics 162 (2005), 777–822. JSTOR 20159929
- Prasit Bhattacharya, Philip Egger and Mark E. Mahowald, On the periodic v2-self-map of A1, Algebraic and Geometric Topology 17 (2017) 657–692. doi:10.2140/agt.2017.17.657
