= EHP =

EHP may refer to:

- E.H.P., a 1920s French automobile manufacturer
- Eastern Highlands Province in Papua New Guinea
- EHP spectral sequence in mathematics
- (Turkish: Emekçi Hareket Partisi), Labourist Movement Party, a political party in Turkey
- Environmental Health Perspectives, a scholarly journal
- Environmental Planning & Historic Preservation (EHP), a Federal Emergency Management Agency (FEMA) program
- Everglades Holiday Park, in Fort Lauderdale, Florida
- Sahrawi peseta, the de facto currency of the Sahrawi Arab Democratic Republic
- Electron-Hole Pairs, the fundamental unit of generation and recombination in semiconductors
