= Frank Adams =

British mathematician (1930–1989)

Frank Adams FRS
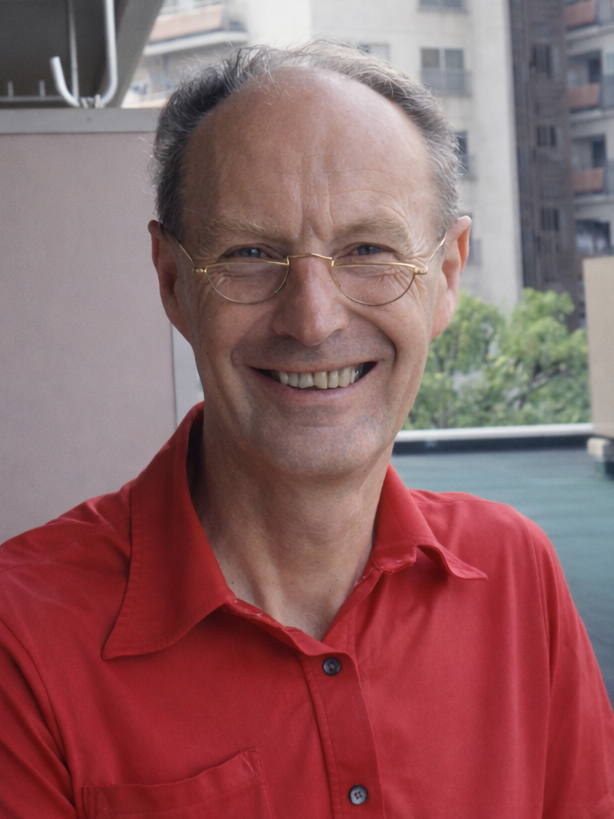
- Frank Adams in August 1988
- Born: 5 November 1930; Woolwich, London, United Kingdom
- Died: 7 January 1989 (aged 58); Brampton, Cambridgeshire, United Kingdom
- Education: University of Cambridge
- Known for: Adams spectral sequence Adams operations Adams conjecture
- Awards: Berwick Prize (1963); Senior Whitehead Prize (1974); Sylvester Medal (1982)
- Scientific career
- Fields: Mathematics
- Institutions: University of Cambridge
- Thesis: On Spectral Sequences and Self-Obstruction Invariants (1956)
- Doctoral advisor: Shaun Wylie
- Doctoral students: Béla Bollobás; Peter Johnstone; Andrew Ranicki; C. T. C. Wall; Lam Siu-por

John Frank Adams FRS (5 November 1930 – 7 January 1989) was a British mathematician, one of the major contributors to homotopy theory.

== Life ==
He was born in Woolwich, a suburb in south-east London, and attended Bedford School. He had a younger brother, Michael Adams, who rose to the rank of Air Vice-Marshal in the Royal Air Force. He began his academic career at Trinity College, Cambridge, as a student of Abram Besicovitch, but soon switched to algebraic topology. He received his PhD from the University of Cambridge in 1956. His thesis, written under the direction of Shaun Wylie, was titled On spectral sequences and self-obstruction invariants. He held the Fielden Chair at the University of Manchester (1964–1970), and became Lowndean Professor of Astronomy and Geometry at the University of Cambridge (1970–1989). He was elected a Fellow of the Royal Society in 1964.

His interests included mountaineering—he would demonstrate how to climb right round a table at parties (a Whitney traverse)—and the game of Go.

He died in a car crash in Brampton. There is a memorial plaque for him in the Chapel of Trinity College, Cambridge.

== Work ==
In the 1950s, homotopy theory was at an early stage of development, and unsolved problems abounded. Adams made a number of important theoretical advances in algebraic topology, but his innovations were always motivated by specific problems. Influenced by the French school of Henri Cartan and Jean-Pierre Serre, he reformulated and strengthened their method of killing homotopy groups in spectral sequence terms, creating the basic tool of stable homotopy theory now known as the Adams spectral sequence. This begins with Ext groups calculated over the ring of cohomology operations, which is the Steenrod algebra in the classical case. He used this spectral sequence to attack the celebrated Hopf invariant one problem, which he completely solved in a 1960 paper by making a deep analysis of secondary cohomology operations. The Adams–Novikov spectral sequence is an analogue of the Adams spectral sequence using an extraordinary cohomology theory in place of classical cohomology: it is a computational tool of great potential scope.

Adams was also a pioneer in the application of K-theory. He invented the Adams operations in K-theory, which are derived from the exterior powers; they are now also widely used in purely algebraic contexts. Adams introduced them in a 1962 paper to solve the famous vector fields on spheres problem. Subsequently he used them to investigate the Adams conjecture, which is concerned (in one instance) with the image of the J-homomorphism in the stable homotopy groups of spheres. A later paper of Adams and Michael F. Atiyah uses the Adams operations to give an extremely elegant and much faster version of the above-mentioned Hopf invariant one result.

In 1974 Adams became the first recipient of the Senior Whitehead Prize, awarded by the London Mathematical Society. He was a visiting scholar at the Institute for Advanced Study in 1957–58.

Adams had many talented students, and was highly influential in the development of algebraic topology in Britain and worldwide. His University of Chicago lectures were published in a 1996 series titled "Chicago Lectures in Mathematics Series", such as Lectures on Exceptional Lie Groups and Stable Homotopy and Generalised Homology ISBN 0-226-00524-0 .

== Recognition ==
The main mathematics research seminar room in the Alan Turing Building at the University of Manchester is named in his honour.

== See also ==
- Adams filtration

== Publications ==
- Adams, J. Frank (1992), May, J. Peter; Thomas, Charles B. (eds.), The selected works of J. Frank Adams. Vol. I, Cambridge University Press, ISBN 0-521-41063-0, MR 1203312
- Adams, J. Frank (1992), May, J. Peter; Thomas, Charles B. (eds.), The selected works of J. Frank Adams. Vol. II, Cambridge University Press, ISBN 978-0-521-11068-6, MR 1203312

Educational offices
Preceded by Max Newman	Fielden Chair of Pure Mathematics	Succeeded by Ian G. Macdonald
