= Formal manifold =

In geometry and topology, a formal manifold can mean one of a number of related concepts:

- In the sense of Dennis Sullivan, a formal manifold is one whose real homotopy type is a formal consequence of its real cohomology ring; algebro-topologically this means in particular that all Massey products vanish.
- A stronger notion is a geometrically formal manifold, a manifold on which all wedge products of harmonic forms are harmonic.
