= Franklin P. Peterson =

American mathematician (1930–2000)

Franklin Paul Peterson (1930–2000) was an American mathematician specializing in algebraic topology. He was a professor of mathematics at the Massachusetts Institute of Technology.

== Life and career ==
Peterson was born in Aurora, Illinois, on August 27, 1930, the older of two brothers. His father died when he was young, and he was raised by his mother and uncle. He attended Northwestern University, graduating in 1952, and earned his Ph.D. in 1955 from Princeton University under the supervision of Norman Steenrod. After postdoctoral studies at Princeton, he joined the MIT faculty in 1958.

Peterson edited the Transactions of the American Mathematical Society from 1966 to 1970. He also served for many years as treasurer of the AMS; in that role he played a key role in resolving tensions between the dual directors of the society as it was then structured, and worked to build up a large reserve fund for the society.

Peterson married Marilyn Rutz in 1959. He died of a stroke on September 1, 2000, near Washington, DC.

== Contributions ==
Peterson's early research used cohomology to study homotopy equivalence. Later, he did important work on the properties of loop spaces.

The Peterson–Stein formula is named after him, after he wrote about it with Norman Stein in 1960. He also introduced the Brown–Peterson cohomology with Edgar H. Brown in 1966.

He advised over 20 doctoral students (different sources give different numbers, in part because Robert E. Mosher, whom Peterson considered his first student, had a different official advisor) and has over 100 academic descendants.

== Selected publications ==
- Peterson, Franklin P.; Stein, Norman (1960), "The dual of a secondary cohomology operation", Illinois Journal of Mathematics, 4 (3): 397–404, doi:10.1215/ijm/1255456056, MR 0151967.
- Ganea, Tudor; Hilton, Peter J.; Peterson, Franklin P. (1962). "On the homotopy-commutativity of loop-spaces and suspensions". Topology. 1 (2): 133–141. doi:10.1016/0040-9383(65)90021-2. MR 0150774.
- Brown, Edgar H. Jr.; Peterson, Franklin P. (1966), "A spectrum whose Z_{p} cohomology is the algebra of reduced p^{th} powers", Topology, 5 (2): 149–154, doi:10.1016/0040-9383(66)90015-2, MR 0192494.
- Massey, William S.; Peterson, Franklin P. (1967), The mod 2 cohomology structure of certain fibre spaces, Memoirs of the American Mathematical Society, vol. 74, Providence, R.I.: American Mathematical Society, p. 97, MR 0226637.
- Campbell, H. E. A.; Peterson, Franklin P.; Selick, Paul S. (1986), "Self-maps of loop spaces. I", Transactions of the American Mathematical Society, 293 (1): 1–39, doi:10.2307/2000269, JSTOR 2000269, MR 0814910. Part II (with Frederick R. Cohen), pp. 41–51.
