= Robert Zink =

American mathematician (died 2020)

Robert Edwin Zink (died July 30, 2020, in West Lafayette, Indiana) was professor emeritus of mathematics at Purdue University.

== Biography ==
Zink is a native of Minneapolis. He attended Lake Harriet Elementary School and earned his B.A., M.A., and Ph.D. degrees from the University of Minnesota. His Ph.D. was awarded in 1953. He was supervised by Bernard Russell Gelbaum and his dissertation was entitled Direct Unions of Measure Spaces.

He ran unsuccessfully for an at-large seat on the West Lafayette City Council in 1971.

== Career ==
Zink joined the Purdue faculty in 1953. Other than a year in the military and sabbatical years at Wabash College (1961–62) and the University of California, Irvine (1968–69), Zink spent his entire career at Purdue.

He published 32 articles in refereed journals, supervised six doctoral students and earned the Murphy Excellence in Undergraduate Teaching award in 1995 and the Frederick L. Hovde Outstanding Faculty Fellow Award in 1985.

Zink retired in 1998 but continued teaching for seven years without pay (one mathematics course and one in aviation technology).

== Publications ==
- On the structure of measure spaces
- Darst, Richard B., and Robert E. Zink. “A NOTE ON THE DEFINITION OF AN ORLICZ SPACE.” Real Analysis Exchange, vol. 21, no. 1, 1995, pp. 356–362. JSTOR, www.jstor.org/stable/44153928. Accessed 28 Mar. 2021.
