= May spectral sequence =

In mathematics, the May spectral sequence is a spectral sequence, introduced by J. Peter May (1965, 1966). It is used for calculating the initial term of the Adams spectral sequence, which is in turn used for calculating the stable homotopy groups of spheres. The May spectral sequence is described in detail in (Ravenel 2003, pp. 67–74).
