= Zhouli Xu =

Chinese mathematician (born 1987)

- Born: 1987 (age 38–39)
- Education: Peking University (BS, MS); University of Chicago (PhD)
- Known for: Homotopy groups of spheres
- Awards: K-Theory prize (2022); Fellow of the American Mathematical Society (2023); AMS Centennial Fellowship (2025)
- Scientific career
- Fields: Mathematics
- Workplaces: Massachusetts Institute of Technology; University of California, San Diego; University of California, Los Angeles
- Thesis: In and around stable homotopy groups of spheres (2017)
- Doctoral advisor: J. Peter May, Daniel Isaksen, Mark Mahowald

Zhouli Xu (Chinese: 徐宙利; born 1987) is a Chinese mathematician specializing in topology as a Professor of Mathematics at the University of California, Los Angeles, known for computations of homotopy groups of spheres.

== Education and career ==
Xu earned both his B.S. and M.S. in mathematics from Peking University and his Ph.D. from the University of Chicago in 2017 under the supervision of J. Peter May, Daniel Isaksen, and Mark Mahowald.

Xu was a C.L.E. Moore Instructor at Massachusetts Institute of Technology from 2017 to 2020. He was a member of the mathematics faculty at University of California, San Diego from 2020 and 2024. Since 2024, he has been a professor in the mathematics department at University of California, Los Angeles.

== Work ==
Xu works in algebraic topology and focuses on classical, motivic and equivariant homotopy groups of spheres, with connections and applications to chromatic homotopy theory and geometric topology.

Xu's research accomplishments include his joint works with collaborators in proving that the 61-dimensional sphere has a unique smooth structure, proving a "10/8 + 4"-theorem on the geography problem in 4-dimensional topology, developing the motivic deformation method and the Chow t-structure, and computing the classical and motivic stable homotopy groups of spheres in the previously unknown range of dimensions.

Xu, in collaboration with Weinan Lin and Guozhen Wang, proved that $h_{6}^2$ survives in the Adams spectral sequence so that there exists a manifold of Kervaire invariant 1 in dimension 126, resolving the last case of the Kervaire invariant problem. ("Computing differentials in the Adams spectral sequence"., "On the Last Kervaire Invariant Problem".).

== Awards and honors ==
Xu is a recipient of the Plotnick Fellowship in 2015, and the William Rainey Harper Dissertation Fellowship in 2016, both by the University of Chicago.

Xu is a recipient of the K-Theory prize in 2022, which is awarded to two recipients of no more than 35 years of age once every four years by the K-Theory Foundation, for his work in the computation of homotopy groups of spheres using motivic homotopy theory.

Xu is an invited speaker in the topology section at the International Congress of Mathematicians 2022.

Xu is elected as a Fellow of the American Mathematical Society of class 2023, for contributions to stable homotopy theory, applications to manifold topology, and motivic homotopy theory.

Xu has been awarded the 2025-2026 AMS Centennial Fellowship.

== Selected publications ==
- "The Strong Kervaire invariant problem in dimension 62", Geometry and Topology 20-3 (2016), 1611–1624.
- (with Guozhen Wang) "The triviality of the 61-stem in the stable homotopy groups of spheres", Annals of Mathematics 186(2) (2017), 501–580.
- (with Dan Isaksen, Guozhen Wang) "Stable homotopy groups of spheres", Proceedings of the National Academy of Sciences October 6, 2020 117 (40) 24757-24763.
- (with Michael J. Hopkins, Jianfeng Lin, XiaoLin Danny Shi) "Intersection forms of spin 4-manifolds and Pin(2)-equivariant Mahowald invariants", Comm. Amer. Math. Soc. (2) (2022), 22-132.
- (with Dan Isaksen, Guozhen Wang) "Stable homotopy groups of spheres: from dimension 0 to 90", Publications Mathématiques de l'IHÉS 137, 107–243 (2023).
- (with Bogdan Gheorghe, Guozhen Wang) "The special fiber of the motivic deformation of the stable homotopy category is algebraic", Acta Mathematica Vol. 226, No. 2 (2021), 319–407.
- (with Tom Bachmann, Hana Jia Kong, Guozhen Wang) "The Chow t-structure on the ∞-category of motivic spectra", Annals of Mathematics 195(2) (2022), 707–773.
- (with Robert Burklund) "The Adams differentials on the classes $h_j^3$", Inventiones Mathematicae Volume 239, pages 1–77, (2025).
- (with Weinan Lin and Guozhen Wang) "On the Last Kervaire Invariant Problem". arXiv preprint, (2024).
