= Massey product =

Operation in algebraic topology

The Massey product is an algebraic generalization of the phenomenon of Borromean rings.

In algebraic topology and homotopical algebra, a Massey product is a higher order cohomology operation on the cohomology of differential graded (dg-)algebras introduced by William S. Massey in 1958, which is closely related to the associativity of the cup product. Massey products obstruct formality and weak equivalences between dg-algebras.

Let $a,b,c$ be elements of the cohomology algebra $H^*(A)$ of a differential graded algebra $A$. If $ab=bc=0$, the Massey triple product $\langle a,b,c\rangle$ is a class in the quotient group$\frac{H^{|a|+|b|+|c|-1}(A)}{aH^{|b|+|c| -1}(A)+H^{|a|+|b|-1}(A)c}$ where $|x|$ is the degree of $x.$ There are higher order Massey products that take more than three arguments.

== Massey triple product ==
Let $(A, \cup)$ be a dg-algebra where $\cup$ is the cup product: for example the singular complex of a topological space or de Rham complex of a manifold. The cohomology ring $H^\ast(A)$ has its multiplicative structure directly inherited from the associative product $\cup$ from $A$. Let $a,b, c \in H^\ast(A)$ be three cohomology classes of $A$ such $a \cup b=b \cup c = 0$. Given any three lifts $u, v, w \in A$ representing these classes, we can find coboundaries $s,t \in A$ such that $u\cup v=ds$ and $v\cup w=dt$. The Massey product is defined to be $\bar s \cup w + \bar u \cup t$ where $\bar u$ is $(-1)^{\deg(u)+1}u$. This is a cocycle as $d\left(\bar s \cup w + \bar u \cup t\right) = (u \cup v )\cup w - u \cup ( v\cup w) = 0$. The cohomology class represented by this cocycle is the Massey product.

We have brushed over one subtlety, which is that the $s,t$ chosen in the above are not unique. Indeed, one can add any cocycle $\sigma$ to $s$ or $t$ as $d(s + \sigma) = ds + d\sigma = ds = u\cup v$. We thus take all choices at one to define th Massey triple product as

$$\langle [u],[v],[w]\rangle = \{[\bar s \cup w + \bar u\cup t] \mid ds=\bar u\cup v, dt=\bar v \cup w\}.$$.

The Massey triple product is thus not an element of $H^*(A)$, but a set of elements of $H^*(A)$, possibly empty and possibly containing more than one element. If $u, v, w$ have degrees $i,j,k$, then the Massey product has degree $i+j+k-1$, with the $-1$ coming from the differential $d$. If it is empty or contains zero, we say that it is trivial.

The Massey product is nonempty if the products $uv$ and $vw$ are both exact, in which case all its elements are in the same element of the quotient group

$$\displaystyle
H^*(A)/([u]\cup H^*(A)+H^*(A)\cup [w]).$$

So the Massey product can be regarded as a partial function defined on triples of classes, defined up to adding elements in $([u]\cup H^*(A)+H^*(A)\cup [w]) =\{[u]\cup h + h' \cup [w] \colon h, h' \in H^*(A)\}$ .

Geometrically, in the singular cohomology of a manifold, one interprets the product dually in terms of bounding manifolds and intersections, following Poincaré duality: dual to cocycles are cycles, often representable as closed manifolds (without boundary), dual to product is intersection, and dual to the subtraction of the bounding products is gluing the two bounding manifolds together along the boundary, obtaining a closed manifold which represents the homology class dual of the Massey product. In reality homology classes of manifolds cannot always be represented by manifolds as a representing cycle may have singularities – but, with this caveat, the dual picture is correct.

== Generalizations ==
More generally, the n-fold Massey product $\langle a_{1,1}, a_{2,2},\ldots ,a_{n,n}\rangle$ of n elements of $H^*(A)$ is defined to be the set of elements of the form

$$\bar a_{1,1}\cup a_{2,n}+\bar a_{1,2}\cup a_{3,n}+\cdots+\bar a_{1,n-1}\cup a_{n,n}$$

for all solutions of the equations

$$da_{i,j} = \bar a_{i,i}\cup a_{i+1,j}+\bar a_{i,i+1}\cup a_{i+2,j}+\cdots+\bar a_{i,j-1}\cup a_{j,j}$$,

with $1 \le i\le j\le n$ and $(i,j)\ne (1,n)$, where $\bar u$ denotes $(-1)^{\deg(u)}u$.

The higher order Massey product $\langle a_{1,1}, a_{2,2},\ldots ,a_{n,n}\rangle$ can be thought of as the obstruction to solving the latter system of equations for all $1 \le i\le j\le n$, in the sense that it contains the 0 cohomology class if and only if these equations are solvable. This n-fold Massey product is an $n-1$ order cohomology operation, meaning that for it to be nonempty many lower order Massey operations have to contain 0, and moreover the cohomology classes it represents all differ by terms involving lower order operations. The 2-fold Massey product is just the usual cup product and is a first order cohomology operation, and the 3-fold Massey product is the same as the triple Massey product defined above and is a secondary cohomology operation.

Matric Massey products, developed by J. Peter May, generalise Massey triple products to non-monomial relations. These can be used to describe all of the differentials of the Eilenberg–Moore spectral sequence.

Massey triple products and higher products were recently extended to algebras over quadratic operads including to operads in positive characteristic.

== Examples ==
The complement of the Borromean rings has a non-trivial Massey product.

The complement of the Borromean rings in $\mathbb R^3$gives an example where the triple Massey product is defined and non-zero. Note the cohomology of the complement can be computed using Alexander duality. If u, v, and w are 1-cochains dual to the 3 rings, then the cup product of any pair is a multiple of the corresponding linking number and so zero, while the Massey product of all three elements is non-zero, showing that the Borromean rings are linked. The algebra reflects the geometry: the rings are pairwise unlinked, corresponding to the pairwise products vanishing, but are overall linked, corresponding to the 3-fold product not vanishing.

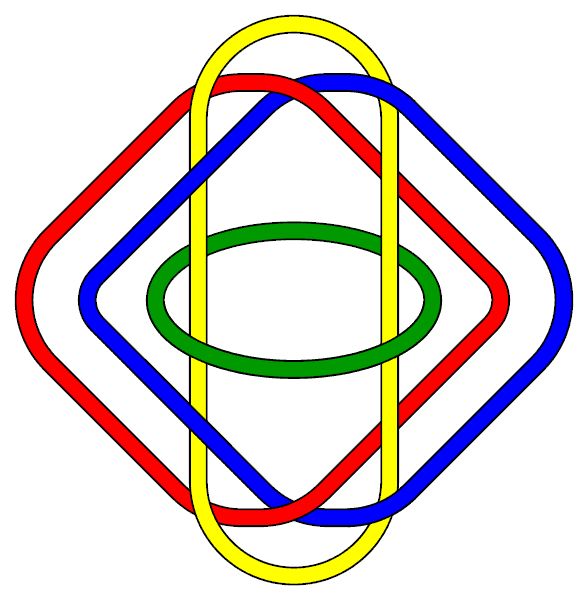
Non-trivial Brunnian links correspond to non-vanishing Massey products.

More generally, n-component Brunnian links – links such that any $(n-1)$-component sublink is unlinked, but the overall n-component link is non-trivially linked – correspond to n-fold Massey products, with the unlinking of the $(n-1)$-component sublink corresponding to the vanishing of the $(n-1)$-fold Massey products, and the overall n-component linking corresponding to the non-vanishing of the n-fold Massey product.

Given the dg-algebra $A = T(a, b, c, u, v, z)/(z - a \cup u - v \cup u )$, where $a, b, c, z$ are coycles and $d u = a \cup b \mbox{ and } dv = b \cup c$, and $|a| = |b| = |c| = 2$ and $|u| = |v| = 3$, and $|z| = 5$. Then $\langle a,b,c \rangle = \{z\}$. Here $T(-)$ indicates the (graded) tensor algebra and $(z - a \cup u - v \cup u )$ is the two-sided ideal generated by $z - a \cup u - v \cup u.$

== Applications ==
If a manifold is formal (in the sense of Sullivan), then all Massey products on the space must vanish; thus, one strategy for showing that a given manifold is not formal is to exhibit a non-trivial Massey product. Here a formal manifold is one whose rational homotopy type can be deduced ("formally") from a finite-dimensional "minimal model" of its de Rham complex. Deligne, Griffiths, Morgan and Sullivan showed that compact Kähler manifolds are formal.

Uehara and Massey used the Massey triple product to prove that the Whitehead product satisfies the Jacobi identity.

Massey products of higher order appear when computing twisted K-theory by means of the Atiyah–Hirzebruch spectral sequence (AHSS). In particular, if H is the twist 3-class, Atiyah and Segal showed that, rationally, the higher order differentials $d_{2p+1}\$ in the AHSS acting on a class x are given by the Massey product of p copies of H with a single copy of x.

Salvatore and Longoni use a Massey product to show that the homotopy type of the configuration space of two points in a lens space depends non-trivially on the simple homotopy type of the lens space.

== See also ==
- Toda bracket
