= Hopf construction =

In algebraic topology, the Hopf construction constructs a map from the join $X*Y$ of two spaces $X$ and $Y$ to the suspension $SZ$ of a space $Z$ out of a map from $X\times Y$ to $Z$. It was introduced by Hopf (1935) in the case when $X$ and $Y$ are spheres. Whitehead (1942) used it to define the J-homomorphism.

== Construction ==
The Hopf construction can be obtained as the composition of a map

$X*Y\rightarrow S(X\times Y)$

and the suspension

$S(X\times Y)\rightarrow SZ$

of the map from $X\times Y$ to $Z$.

The map from $X*Y$ to $S(X\times Y)$ can be obtained by regarding both sides as a quotient of $X\times Y\times I$ where $I$ is the unit interval. For $X*Y$ one identifies $(x,y,0)$ with $(z,y,0)$ and $(x,y,1)$ with $(x,z,1)$, while for $S(X\times Y)$ one contracts all points of the form $(x,y,0)$ to a point and also contracts all points of the form $(x,y,1)$ to a point. So the map from $X\times Y\times I$ to $S(X\times Y)$ factors through $X*Y$.
