= Mona Merling =

Romanian-American mathematician

Mona Merling is a Romanian-American mathematician specializing in algebraic topology, including algebraic K-theory and equivariant stable homotopy theory. She is an associate professor of mathematics at the University of Pennsylvania.

== Education and career ==
Merling has dual Romanian and American citizenship. She credits a Romanian mathematics teacher, Mihaela Flamaropol, for sparking her interest in mathematics and in mathematics competitions.

She majored in mathematics as an undergraduate at Bard College, where she received her bachelor's degree in 2009. At Bard, mathematician Lauren Lynn Rose became a faculty mentor. She continued her studies in mathematics at the University of Chicago, received a master's degree there in 2010, and completed her Ph.D. in 2014. Her dissertation, Equivariant algebraic K-theory, was supervised by J. Peter May.

She was a postdoctoral researcher and J. J. Sylvester Assistant Professor at Johns Hopkins University from 2014 to 2018, working there under the mentorship of Jack Morava. She joined the University of Pennsylvania as an assistant professor of mathematics in 2018, and was tenured as an associate professor in 2024.

== Recognition ==
Merling was the 2025 recipient of the Joan & Joseph Birman Research Prize in Topology and Geometry, given to her "for innovative and impactful research in algebraic K-theory, equivariant homotopy theory, and their applications to manifold theory".
