= Peterson–Stein formula =

Describes the Spanier–Whitehead dual of a secondary cohomology operation

In mathematics, the Peterson–Stein formula, introduced by Franklin P. Peterson and Norman Stein (1960), describes the Spanier–Whitehead dual of a secondary cohomology operation.
