= Hopf fibration =

Fiber bundle of the 3-sphere over the 2-sphere, with 1-spheres as fibers

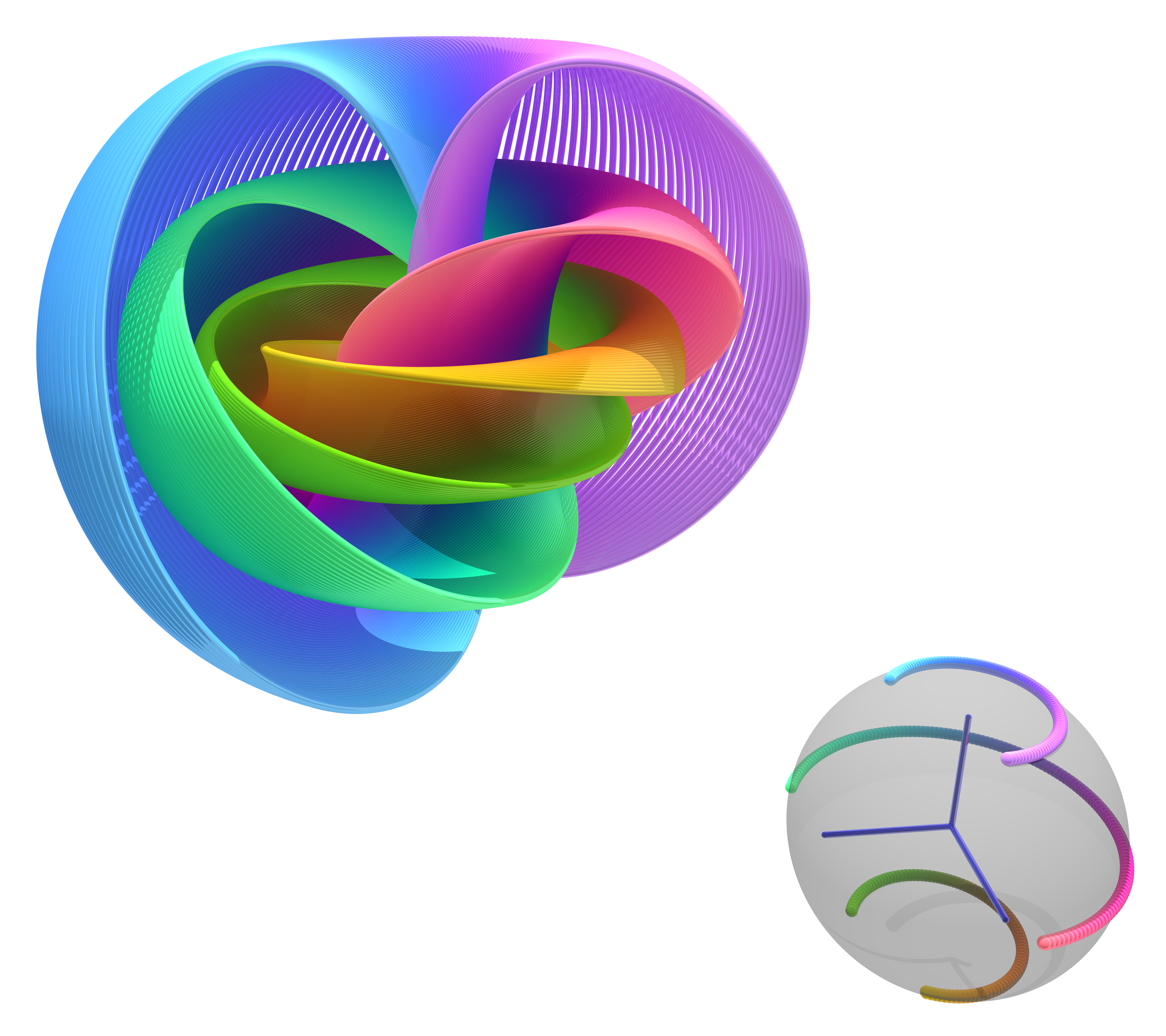
The Hopf fibration can be visualized using a stereographic projection of S^{3} to R^{3} and then compressing R^{3} to a ball. This image shows points on S^{2} and their corresponding fibers with the same color.

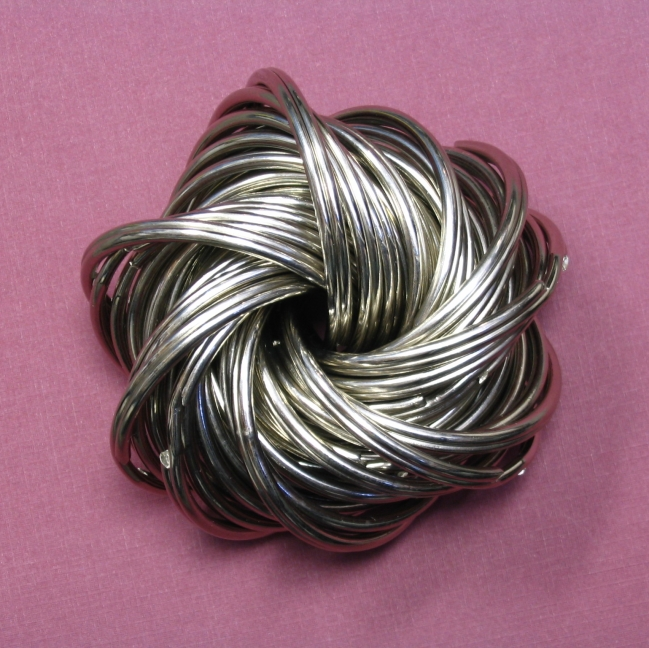
Pairwise linked keyrings mimic part of the Hopf fibration.

In differential topology, the Hopf fibration (also known as the Hopf bundle or Hopf map) describes a 3-sphere (a hypersphere in four-dimensional space) in terms of circles and an ordinary sphere. Discovered by Heinz Hopf in 1931, it is an influential early example of a fiber bundle. Technically, Hopf found a many-to-one continuous function (or "map") from the 3-sphere onto the 2-sphere such that each distinct point of the 2-sphere is mapped from a distinct great circle of the 3-sphere (Hopf 1931). Thus the 3-sphere is composed of fibers, where each fiber is a circle — one for each point of the 2-sphere.

This fiber bundle structure is denoted

$$S^1 \hookrightarrow S^3 \xrightarrow{\ p \, } S^2,$$

meaning that the fiber space $S^1$ (a circle) is embedded in the total space $S^3$ (the 3-sphere), and $p: S^3 \to S^2$ (Hopf's map) projects $S^3$ onto the base space $S^2$ (the ordinary 2-sphere). The Hopf fibration, like any fiber bundle, has the important property that it is locally a product space. However it is not a trivial fiber bundle, i.e. $S^3$ is not globally a product of $S^2$ and $S^1$ although locally it is indistinguishable from it.

This has many implications: for example the existence of this bundle shows that the higher homotopy groups of spheres are not trivial in general. It also provides a basic example of a principal bundle, by identifying the fiber with the circle group.

Stereographic projection of the Hopf fibration induces a remarkable structure on $\R^3$, in which all of 3-dimensional space, except for the z-axis, is filled with nested tori made of linking Villarceau circles. Here each fiber projects to a circle in space (one of which is a line, thought of as a "circle through infinity"). Each torus is the stereographic projection of the inverse image of a circle of latitude of the 2-sphere. (Topologically, a torus is the product of two circles.) These tori are illustrated in the images at right. When $\R^3$ is compressed to the boundary of a ball, some geometric structure is lost although the topological structure is retained (see Topology and geometry). The loops are homeomorphic to circles, although they are not geometric circles.

There are numerous generalizations of the Hopf fibration. The unit sphere in complex coordinate space $\C^{n+1}$ fibers naturally over the complex projective space $\mathbb{CP}^n$ with circles as fibers, and there are also real, quaternionic, and octonionic versions of these fibrations. In particular, the Hopf fibration belongs to a family of four fiber bundles in which the total space, base space, and fiber space are all spheres:

$$S^0\hookrightarrow S^1 \to S^1,$$
$$S^1\hookrightarrow S^3 \to S^2,$$
$$S^3\hookrightarrow S^7 \to S^4,$$
$$S^7\hookrightarrow S^{15}\to S^8.$$

By Adams's theorem such fibrations can occur only in these dimensions.

== Definition and construction ==
For any natural number n, an n-dimensional sphere, or n-sphere, can be defined as the set of points in an $(n+1)$-dimensional space which are a fixed distance from a central point. For concreteness, the central point can be taken to be the origin, and the distance of the points on the sphere from this origin can be assumed to be a unit length. With this convention, the n-sphere, $S^n$, consists of the points $(x_1, x_2,\ldots , x_{n+ 1})$ in $\R^{n+1}$ with $x_1^2 + x_2^2 +\ldots + x_{n+ 1}^2 = 1$. For example, the 3-sphere consists of the points $(x_1, x_2, x_3, x_4)$ in $\R^{4}$ with $x_1^2 + x_2^2 + x_3^2 + x_4^2 = 1$.

The Hopf fibration $p: S^3 \to S^2$ of the 3-sphere over the 2-sphere can be defined in several ways.

=== Direct construction ===
Identify $\R^{4}$ with $\C^2$ (where $\C$ denotes the complex numbers) by writing:

$$(x_1, x_2, x_3, x_4)  \leftrightarrow  (z_0, z_1) = (x_1 + ix_2, \, x_3+ix_4),$$

and identify $\R^3$ with $\C \times \R$ by writing

$$(x_1, x_2, x_3)  \leftrightarrow (z, x) =  (x_1 + ix_2, \, x_3).$$

Thus $S^3$ is identified with the subset of all $(z_0,z_1)$ in $\C^2$ such that $|z_0|^2 + |z_1|^2 = 1$, and $S^2$ is identified with the subset of all $(z,x)$ in $\C \times \R$ such that $|z|^2 + x^2 = 1$. (Here, for a complex number $z = a + ib$, its squared absolute value is $|z|^2 = z z^* = a^2 + b^2$, where the star denotes the complex conjugate.) Then the Hopf fibration $p$ is defined by

$$p(z_0,z_1) = (2z_0z_1^{\ast}, \left|z_0 \right|^2-\left|z_1 \right|^2).$$

The first component is a complex number, whereas the second component is real. Any point on the 3-sphere must have the property that $|z_0|^2 + |z_1|^2 = 1$. If that is so, then $p(z_0,z_1)$ lies on the unit 2-sphere in $\C \times \R$, as may be shown by adding the squares of the absolute values of the complex and real components of $p$:

$$\begin{alignat}{2}
2 z_{0} z_{1}^{\ast} \cdot 2 z_{0}^{\ast} z_{1} +
\left( \left| z_{0} \right|^{2} - \left| z_{1} \right|^{2} \right)^{2} &= 4 \left| z_{0} \right|^{2} \left| z_{1} \right|^{2} +
\left| z_{0} \right|^{4} - 2 \left| z_{0} \right|^{2} \left| z_{1} \right|^{2} + \left| z_{1} \right|^{4} \\
&= \left( \left| z_{0} \right|^{2} + \left| z_{1} \right|^{2} \right)^{2} = 1
\end{alignat}$$

Furthermore, if two points on the 3-sphere map to the same point on the 2-sphere, i.e., if $p(z_0,z_1) = p(w_0,w_1)$, then $(w_0,w_1)$ must equal $(\lambda z_0,\lambda z_1)$ for some complex number $\lambda$ with $|\lambda|^2 = 1$. The converse is also true; any two points on the 3-sphere that differ by a common complex factor $\lambda$ map to the same point on the 2-sphere. These conclusions follow, because the complex factor $\lambda$ cancels with its complex conjugate $\lambda^*$ in both parts of $p$: in the complex $2 z_0 z_1^*$ component and in the real component $|z_0|^2 - |z_1|^2$.

Since the set of complex numbers $\lambda$ with $|\lambda|^2 = 1$ form the unit circle in the complex plane, it follows that for each point $m$ in $S^2$, the inverse image $p^{-1}(m)$ is a circle, i.e., $p^{-1}(m) \cong S^1$. Thus the 3-sphere is realized as a disjoint union of these circular fibers.

A direct parametrization of the 3-sphere employing the Hopf map is as follows.

$$z_0 = e^{i\,\frac{\xi_1+\xi_2}{2}}\sin\eta$$
$$z_1 = e^{i\,\frac{\xi_2-\xi_1}{2}}\cos\eta.$$

or in Euclidean $\R^4$

$$x_1 = \cos\left(\frac{\xi_1+\xi_2}{2}\right)\sin\eta$$
$$x_2 = \sin\left(\frac{\xi_1+\xi_2}{2}\right)\sin\eta$$
$$x_3 = \cos\left(\frac{\xi_2-\xi_1}{2}\right)\cos\eta$$
$$x_4 = \sin\left(\frac{\xi_2-\xi_1}{2}\right)\cos\eta$$

Where $\eta$ runs over the range from $0$ to $\pi / 2$, $\xi_1$ runs over the range from $0$ to $2\pi$, and $\xi_2$ can take any value from $0$ to $4\pi$. Every value of $\eta$, except $0$ and $\pi / 2$ which specify circles, specifies a separate flat torus in the 3-sphere, and one round trip ($0$ to $4\pi$) of either $\xi_1$ or $\xi_2$ causes you to make one full circle of both limbs of the torus.

A mapping of the above parametrization to the 2-sphere is as follows, with points on the circles parametrized by $\xi_2$.

$$z = \cos(2\eta)$$
$$x = \sin(2\eta)\cos\xi_1$$
$$y = \sin(2\eta)\sin\xi_1$$

==== Geometric interpretation using the complex projective line ====
A geometric interpretation of the fibration may be obtained using the complex projective line, $\mathbb{CP}^1$, which is defined to be the set of all complex one-dimensional subspaces of $\C^2$. Equivalently, $\mathbb{CP}^1$ is the quotient of $\C^2\setminus\{0\}$ by the equivalence relation which identifies $(z_0,z_1)$ with $(\lambda z_0,\lambda z_1)$ for any nonzero complex number $\lambda$. On any complex line in $\C^2$ there is a circle of unit norm, and so the restriction of the quotient map to the points of unit norm is a fibration of $S^3$ over $\mathbb{CP}^1$.

$\mathbb{CP}^1$ is diffeomorphic to a 2-sphere: indeed it can be identified with the Riemann sphere $\C_\infty = \C \cup \{\infty\}$, which is the one point compactification of $\C$ (obtained by adding a point at infinity). The formula given for $p$ above defines an explicit diffeomorphism between the complex projective line and the ordinary 2-sphere in 3-dimensional space. Alternatively, the point $(z_0,z_1)$ can be mapped to the ratio $z_1/z_0$ in the Riemann sphere $\C_\infty$.

==== Fiber bundle structure ====
The Hopf fibration defines a fiber bundle, with bundle projection $p$. This means that it has a "local product structure", in the sense that every point of the 2-sphere has some neighborhood $U$ whose inverse image in the 3-sphere can be identified with the product of $U$ and a circle: $p^{-1}(U) \cong U \times S^1$. Such a fibration is said to be locally trivial.

For the Hopf fibration, it is enough to remove a single point m from $S^2$ and the corresponding circle $p^{-1}(m)$ from $S^3$; thus one can take $U = S^2 \setminus \{m\}$, and any point in $S^2$ has a neighborhood of this form.

=== Geometric interpretation using rotations ===
Another geometric interpretation of the Hopf fibration can be obtained by considering rotations of the 2-sphere in ordinary 3-dimensional space. The rotation group SO(3) has a double cover, the spin group Spin(3), diffeomorphic to the 3-sphere. The spin group acts transitively on $S^2$ by rotations. The stabilizer of a point is isomorphic to the circle group; its elements are angles of rotation leaving the given point unmoved, all sharing the axis connecting that point to the sphere's center. It follows easily that the 3-sphere is a principal circle bundle over the 2-sphere, and this is the Hopf fibration.

To make this more explicit, there are two approaches: the group Spin(3) can either be identified with the group Sp(1) of unit quaternions, or with the special unitary group SU(2).

In the first approach, a vector $(x_1,x_2,x_3,x_4)$ in $\R^{4}$ is interpreted as a quaternion $q \in \H$ by writing

$$q = x_1+\mathbf{i}x_2+\mathbf{j}x_3+\mathbf{k}x_4.\,\!$$

The 3-sphere is then identified with the versors, the quaternions of unit norm, those $q \in \H$ for which $|q|^2 = 1$, where $|q|^2 = q q^*$, which is equal to $x_1^2 + x_2^2 + x_3^2 + x_4^2$ for $q$ as above.

On the other hand, a vector $(y_1, y_2, y_3)$ in $\R^3$ can be interpreted as a pure quaternion

$$p = \mathbf{i}y_1+\mathbf{j}y_2+\mathbf{k}y_3. \,\!$$

Then, as is well-known since Cayley (1845), the mapping

$$p \mapsto q p q^* \,\!$$

is a rotation in $\R^3$: indeed it is clearly an isometry, since $|qpq^*|^2 = qpq^* \, qp^*q^* = qpp^*q^* = |p|^2$, and it is not hard to check that it preserves orientation.

In fact, this identifies the group of versors with the group of rotations of $\R^3$, modulo the fact that the versors $q$ and $-q$ determine the same rotation. As noted above, the rotations act transitively on $S^2$, and the set of versors $q$ which fix a given right versor $p$ have the form $q = u + vp$, where $u$ and $v$ are real numbers with $u^2 + v^2 = 1$. This is a circle subgroup. For concreteness, one can take $p = \mathbf k$, and then the Hopf fibration can be defined as the map sending a versor $\omega$ to $\omega \mathbf k \omega^*$. All the quaternions $\omega q$, where $q$ is one of the circle of versors that fix $\mathbf k$, get mapped to the same thing (which happens to be one of the two 180° rotations rotating $\mathbf k$ to the same place as $\omega$ does).

Another way to look at this fibration is that every versor $\omega$ moves the plane spanned by $\{1,\mathbf k\}$ to a new plane spanned by $\{\omega,\omega \mathbf k\}$. Any quaternion $\omega q$, where $q$ is one of the circle of versors that fix $\mathbf k$, will have the same effect. We put all these into one fibre, and the fibres can be mapped one-to-one to the 2-sphere of 180° rotations which is the range of $\omega \mathbf k \omega^*$.

This approach is related to the direct construction by identifying a quaternion $q = x_1+\mathbf{i}x_2+\mathbf{j}x_3+\mathbf{k}x_4$ with the 2×2 matrix:

$$\begin{bmatrix} x_1+\mathbf i x_2 & x_3+\mathbf i x_4 \\ -x_3+\mathbf i x_4 & x_1-\mathbf i x_2 \end{bmatrix}.\,\!$$

This identifies the group of versors with SU(2), and the imaginary quaternions with the skew-hermitian 2×2 matrices (isomorphic to $\C \times \R$).

==== Explicit formulae ====
The rotation induced by a unit quaternion $q = w + \mathbf{i}x + \mathbf{j}y + \mathbf{k}z$ is given explicitly by the orthogonal matrix

$$\begin{bmatrix}
1-2(y^2+z^2) & 2(xy - wz) & 2(xz+wy)\\
2(xy + wz) & 1-2(x^2+z^2) & 2(yz-wx)\\
2(xz-wy) & 2(yz+wx) & 1-2(x^2+y^2)
\end{bmatrix} .$$

Here we find an explicit real formula for the bundle projection by noting that the fixed unit vector along the $z$ axis, $(0,0,1)$, rotates to another unit vector,

$$\Big(2(xz+wy) , 2(yz-wx) , 1-2(x^2+y^2)\Big) , \,\!$$

which is a continuous function of $(w,x,y,z)$. That is, the image of $q$ is the point on the 2-sphere where it sends the unit vector along the $z$ axis. The fiber for a given point on $S^2$ consists of all those unit quaternions that send the unit vector there.

We can also write an explicit formula for the fiber over a point $(a,b,c)$ in $S^2$. Multiplication of unit quaternions produces composition of rotations, and

$$q_{\theta} = \cos \theta + \mathbf{k} \sin \theta$$

is a rotation by $2\theta$ around the $z$ axis. As $\theta$ varies, this sweeps out a great circle of $S^3$, our prototypical fiber. So long as the base point, $(a,b,c)$, is not the antipode, $(0,0,-1)$, the quaternion

$$q_{(a,b,c)} = \frac{1}{\sqrt{2(1+c)}}(1+c-\mathbf{i}b+\mathbf{j}a)$$

will send $(0,0,1)$ to $(a,b,c)$. Thus the fiber of $(a,b,c)$ is given by quaternions of the form $q_{(a,b,c)} q_\theta$, which are the $S^3$ points

$$\frac{1}{\sqrt{2(1+c)}}
\Big((1+c) \cos (\theta ),
a \sin (\theta )-b \cos (\theta ),
a \cos (\theta )+b \sin (\theta ),
(1+c) \sin (\theta )\Big) . \,\!$$

Since multiplication by $q_{(a,b,c)}$ acts as a rotation of quaternion space, the fiber is not merely a topological circle, it is a geometric circle.

The final fiber, for $(0,0,-1)$, can be given by defining $q_{(0,0,-1)}$ to equal $\mathbf i$, producing

$$\Big(0,\cos (\theta ),-\sin (\theta ),0\Big),$$

which completes the bundle. But note that this one-to-one mapping between $S^3$ and $S^2 \times S^1$ is not continuous on this circle, reflecting the fact that $S^3$ is not topologically equivalent to $S^2 \times S^1$.

Thus, a simple way of visualizing the Hopf fibration is as follows. Any point on the 3-sphere is equivalent to a quaternion, which in turn is equivalent to a particular rotation of a Cartesian coordinate frame in three dimensions. The set of all possible quaternions produces the set of all possible rotations, which moves the tip of one unit vector of such a coordinate frame (say, the $z$ vector) to all possible points on a unit 2-sphere. However, fixing the tip of the $z$ vector does not specify the rotation fully; a further rotation is possible about the $z$ axis. Thus, the 3-sphere is mapped onto the 2-sphere, plus a single rotation.

The rotation can be represented using the Euler angles $\theta$, $\varphi$, and $\psi$. The Hopf mapping maps the rotation to the point on the 2-sphere given by $\theta$ and $\varphi$, and the associated circle is parametrized by $\psi$. Note that when $\theta = \pi$ the Euler angles $\varphi$ and $\psi$ are not well defined individually, so we do not have a one-to-one mapping (or a one-to-two mapping) between the 3-torus of $(\theta, \varphi, \psi)$ and $S^3$.

=== Fluid mechanics ===
If the Hopf fibration is treated as a vector field in 3 dimensional space then there is a solution to the (compressible, non-viscous) Navier–Stokes equations of fluid dynamics in which the fluid flows along the circles of the projection of the Hopf fibration in 3 dimensional space. The size of the velocities, the density and the pressure can be chosen at each point to satisfy the equations. All these quantities fall to zero going away from the centre. If a is the distance to the inner ring, the velocities, pressure and density fields are given by:

$$\mathbf{v}(x,y,z) = A \left(a^2+x^2+y^2+z^2\right)^{-2} \left( 2(-ay+xz), 2(ax+yz) , a^2-x^2-y^2+z^2 \right)$$
$$p(x,y,z) = -A^2B \left(a^2+x^2+y^2+z^2\right)^{-3},$$
$$\rho(x,y,z) = 3B\left(a^2+x^2+y^2+z^2\right)^{-1}$$

for arbitrary constants $A$ and $B$. Similar patterns of fields are found as soliton solutions of magnetohydrodynamics:

== Generalizations ==
The Hopf construction, viewed as a fiber bundle $p: S^3 \to \mathbb{CP}^1$, admits several generalizations, which are also often known as Hopf fibrations. First, one can replace the projective line by an n-dimensional projective space. Second, one can replace the complex numbers by any (real) division algebra, including (for n = 1) the octonions.

=== Real Hopf fibrations ===
A real version of the Hopf fibration is obtained by regarding the circle $S^1$ as a subset of $\R^2$ in the usual way and by identifying antipodal points. This gives a fiber bundle $S^1 \to \mathbb{RP}^1$ over the real projective line with fiber $S^0 = \{1,-1\}$. Just as $\mathbb{CP}^1$ is diffeomorphic to a sphere, $\mathbb{RP}^1$ is diffeomorphic to a circle.

More generally, the n-sphere $S^n$ fibers over real projective space $\mathbb{RP}^n$ with fiber $S^0$.

=== Complex Hopf fibrations ===
The Hopf construction gives circle bundles $p: S^{2n+1} \to \mathbb{CP}^n$ over complex projective space. This is actually the restriction of the tautological line bundle over $\mathbb{CP}^n$ to the unit sphere in $\C^{n+1}$.

=== Quaternionic Hopf fibrations ===
Similarly, one can regard $S^{4n+3}$ as lying in $\H^{n+1}$ (quaternionic n-space) and factor out by unit quaternion (= $S^3$) multiplication to get the quaternionic projective space $\mathbb{HP}^n$. In particular, since $S^4 = \mathbb{HP}^1$, there is a bundle $S^7 \to S^4$ with fiber $S^3$.

=== Octonionic Hopf fibrations ===
A similar construction with the octonions yields a bundle $S^{15} \to S^8$ with fiber $S^7$, but the sphere $S^{31}$ does not fiber over $S^{16}$ with fiber $S^{15}$. One can regard $S^8$ as the octonionic projective line $\mathbb{OP}^1$. Although one can also define an octonionic projective plane $\mathbb{OP}^2$, the sphere $S^{23}$ does not fiber over $\mathbb{OP}^2$ with fiber $S^7$.

=== Fibrations between spheres ===
Sometimes the term "Hopf fibration" is restricted to the fibrations between spheres obtained above, which are

- S^{1} → S^{1} with fiber S^{0}
- S^{3} → S^{2} with fiber S^{1}
- S^{7} → S^{4} with fiber S^{3}
- S^{15} → S^{8} with fiber S^{7}

As a consequence of Adams's theorem, fiber bundles with spheres as total space, base space, and fiber can occur only in these dimensions. Fiber bundles with similar properties, but different from the Hopf fibrations, were used by John Milnor to construct exotic spheres.

=== Twistor fibration ===
There is also a fibration of $\mathbb{CP}^{2n+1}$ over $\mathbb{HP}^n$ known in some circles as the twistor fibration. The fibre is $\mathbb{CP}^1$. Here the $\mathbb{CP}^{2n+1}$ is realized as a quotient of $\mathbb H^{n+1}$ by a maximal commutative subfield of the quaternions.

More generally, Robert Bryant identified all homogeneous fibrations over Riemannian symmetric spaces, whose total spaces are complex manifolds, which he calls twistor spaces. The case described here is the fibration of $\operatorname{Sp}(n+1)/U(1)\times\operatorname{Sp}(n)$ over $\operatorname{Sp}(n+1)/\operatorname{Sp}(1)\times\operatorname{Sp}(n).$

In general, whenever there is a tower of (closed) Lie subgroups $K\subset H\subset G$, there is a fibration of $G/K$ over $G/H$. For the classical Hopf fibration, $G=U(n+1)$, $K=U(n)$, and $H=U(1)\times U(n)$.

== Geometry and applications ==
The fibers of the Hopf fibration stereographically project to a family of Villarceau circles in $\R^3$.

The Hopf fibration has many implications, some purely attractive, others deeper. For example, stereographic projection $S^3 \to \R^3$ induces a remarkable structure in $\R^3$, which in turn illuminates the topology of the bundle (Lyons 2003). Stereographic projection preserves circles and maps the Hopf fibers to geometrically perfect circles in $\R^3$ which fill space. Here there is one exception: the Hopf circle containing the projection point maps to a straight line in $\R^3$ — a "circle through infinity".

The fibers over a circle of latitude on $S^2$ form a torus in $S^3$ (topologically, a torus is the product of two circles) and these project to nested toruses in $\R^3$ which also fill space. The individual fibers map to linking Villarceau circles on these tori, with the exception of the circle through the projection point and the one through its opposite point: the former maps to a straight line, the latter to a unit circle perpendicular to, and centered on, this line, which may be viewed as a degenerate torus whose minor radius has shrunken to zero. Every other fiber image encircles the line as well, and so, by symmetry, each circle is linked through every circle, both in $\R^3$ and in $S^3$. Two such linking circles form a Hopf link in $\R^3$.

Hopf himself proved that the Hopf map has Hopf invariant 1, and therefore is not null-homotopic. In fact it generates the homotopy group π_{3}(S^{2}) and has infinite order.

In quantum mechanics, the Riemann sphere is known as the Bloch sphere, and the Hopf fibration describes the topological structure of a quantum mechanical two-level system or qubit. Similarly, the topology of a pair of entangled two-level systems is given by the Hopf fibration

$$S^3 \hookrightarrow S^7\to S^4.$$

(Mosseri & Dandoloff 2001). Moreover, the Hopf fibration is equivalent to the fiber bundle structure of the Dirac monopole.

Hopf fibration also found applications in robotics, where it was used to generate uniform samples on SO(3) for the probabilistic roadmap algorithm in motion planning. It also found application in the automatic control of quadrotors.

== See also ==
- Villarceau circles
