= Toda bracket =

Concept in mathematics

In mathematics, the Toda bracket is an operation on homotopy classes of maps, in particular on homotopy groups of spheres, named after Hiroshi Toda, who defined them and used them to compute homotopy groups of spheres in (Toda 1962).

== Definition ==
See (Kochman 1990) or (Toda 1962) for more information. Suppose that

$$W\stackrel{f}{\ \to\ } X\stackrel{g}{\ \to\ } Y\stackrel{h}{\ \to\ } Z$$

is a sequence of maps between spaces, such that the compositions $g\circ f$ and $h\circ g$ are both nullhomotopic. Given a space $A$, let $CA$ denote the cone of $A$. Then we get a (non-unique) map

$$F\colon CW\to Y$$

induced by a homotopy from $g\circ f$ to a trivial map, which when post-composed with $h$ gives a map

$$h\circ F\colon CW\to Z$$.

Similarly we get a non-unique map $G\colon CX\to Z$ induced by a homotopy from $h\circ g$ to a trivial map, which when composed with $C_f\colon CW\to CX$, the cone of the map $f$, gives another map,

$$G\circ C_f\colon CW\to Z$$.

By joining these two cones on $W$ and the maps from them to $Z$, we get a map

$$\langle f, g, h\rangle\colon SW\to Z$$

representing an element in the group $[SW, Z]$ of homotopy classes of maps from the suspension $SW$ to $Z$, called the Toda bracket of $f$, $g$, and $h$. The map $\langle f, g, h\rangle$ is not uniquely defined up to homotopy, because there was some choice in choosing the maps from the cones. Changing these maps changes the Toda bracket by adding elements of $h [SW,Y]$ and $[SX,Z]C_f$.

There are also higher Toda brackets of several elements, defined when suitable lower Toda brackets vanish. This parallels the theory of Massey products in cohomology.

== The Toda bracket for stable homotopy groups of spheres ==
The direct sum

$$\pi_{\ast}^S=\bigoplus_{k\ge 0}\pi_k^S$$

of the stable homotopy groups of spheres is a supercommutative graded ring, where multiplication (called composition product) is given by composition of representing maps, and any element of non-zero degree is nilpotent (Nishida 1973).

If f and g and h are elements of $\pi_{\ast}^{S}$ with $f \cdot g= 0$ and $g \cdot h= 0$, there is a Toda bracket $\langle f, g, h\rangle$ of these elements. The Toda bracket is not quite an element of a stable homotopy group, because it is only defined up to addition of composition products of certain other elements. Hiroshi Toda used the composition product and Toda brackets to label many of the elements of homotopy groups. Cohen (1968) showed that every element of the stable homotopy groups of spheres can be expressed using composition products and higher Toda brackets in terms of certain well known elements, called Hopf elements.

== The Toda bracket for general triangulated categories ==
In the case of a general triangulated category the Toda bracket can be defined as follows. Again, suppose that

$$W\stackrel{f}{\ \to\ } X\stackrel{g}{\ \to\ } Y\stackrel{h}{\ \to\ } Z$$

is a sequence of morphism in a triangulated category such that $g\circ f = 0$ and $h\circ g = 0$. Let $C_f$ denote the cone of f so we obtain an exact triangle

$$W\stackrel{f}{\ \to\ } X\stackrel{i}{\ \to\ } C_f \stackrel{q}{\ \to\ } W[1]$$

The relation $g\circ f = 0$ implies that g factors (non-uniquely) through $C_f$ as

$$X\stackrel{i}{\ \to\ } C_f \stackrel{a}{\ \to\ } Y$$

for some $a$. Then, the relation $h\circ a\circ i = h\circ g = 0$ implies that $h\circ a$ factors (non-uniquely) through W[1] as

$$C_f \stackrel{q}{\ \to\ } W[1] \stackrel{b}{\ \to\ } Z$$

for some b. This b is (a choice of) the Toda bracket $\langle f, g, h\rangle$ in the group $\operatorname{hom}(W[1], Z)$.

== Convergence theorem ==
There is a convergence theorem originally due to Moss which states that special Massey products $\langle a,b,c \rangle$ of elements in the $E_r$-page of the Adams spectral sequence contain a permanent cycle, meaning has an associated element in $\pi^s_*(\mathbb{S})$, assuming the elements $a,b,c$ are permanent cycles^{pg 18-19}. Moreover, these Massey products have a lift to a motivic Adams spectral sequence giving an element in the Toda bracket $\langle \alpha,\beta,\gamma \rangle$ in $\pi_{*,*}$ for elements $\alpha,\beta,\gamma$ lifting $a,b,c$.
