= George W. Whitehead =

American mathematician

George William Whitehead, Jr.
- Born: August 2, 1918; Bloomington, Illinois, United States
- Died: April 12, 2004 (aged 85)
- Education: University of Chicago
- Known for: J-homomorphism
- Scientific career
- Fields: Mathematics
- Workplaces: Massachusetts Institute of Technology
- Doctoral advisor: Norman Steenrod
- Doctoral students: Robert Aumann; Edgar H. Brown, Jr. John Coleman Moore

George William Whitehead, Jr. (August 2, 1918 – April 12, 2004) was an American professor of mathematics at the Massachusetts Institute of Technology, a member of the United States National Academy of Sciences, and a Fellow of the American Academy of Arts and Sciences. He is known for his work on algebraic topology. He invented the J-homomorphism, and was among the first to systematically calculate the homotopy groups of spheres. He is also central to the study of stable homotopy theory, in particular making concrete the connections between spectra and generalized homology/cohomology theories.

Whitehead was born in Bloomington, Illinois, and received his Ph.D. in mathematics from the University of Chicago in 1941, under the supervision of Norman Steenrod. After teaching at Purdue University, Princeton University, and Brown University, he took a position at MIT in 1949, where he remained until his retirement in 1985. He advised 13 Ph.D. students, including Robert Aumann, Edgar Brown, Jr., and John Coleman Moore, and has over 1,940 academic descendants (as of 2025).

He was a member of the American Academy of Arts & Sciences (elected in 1954) and the United States National Academy of Sciences (elected in 1972).

== Selected publications ==
- Whitehead, George William (1978). Elements of homotopy theory. Graduate Texts in Mathematics. Vol. 61 (3rd ed.). New York-Berlin: Springer-Verlag. pp. xxi+744. ISBN 978-0-387-90336-1. MR 0516508.
