= Component (group theory) =

Quasisimple subnormal subgroup of a finite group

In mathematics, in the field of group theory, a component of a finite group is a quasisimple subnormal subgroup. Any two distinct components commute. The product of all the components is the layer of the group.

For finite abelian (or nilpotent) groups, p-component is used in a different sense to mean the Sylow p-subgroup, so the abelian group is the product of its p-components for primes p. These are not components in the sense above, as abelian groups are not quasisimple.

A quasisimple subgroup of a finite group is called a standard component if its centralizer has even order, it is normal in the centralizer of every involution centralizing it, and it commutes with none of its conjugates. This concept is used in the classification of finite simple groups, for instance, by showing that under mild restrictions on the standard component, one of the following always holds:

- a standard component is normal (so a component as above),
- the whole group has a nontrivial solvable normal subgroup,
- the subgroup generated by the conjugates of the standard component is on a short list,
- or the standard component is a previously unknown quasisimple group (Aschbacher & Seitz 1976).
