= EHP spectral sequence =

In mathematics, the EHP spectral sequence is a spectral sequence used for inductively calculating the homotopy groups of spheres localized at some prime p. It is described in more detail in Ravenel (2003, chapter 1.5) and Mahowald (2001). It is related to the EHP long exact sequence of Whitehead (1953); the name "EHP" comes from the fact that George W. Whitehead named 3 of the maps of his sequence "E" (the first letter of the German word "Einhängung" meaning "suspension"), "H" (for Heinz Hopf, as this map is the second Hopf–James invariant), and "P" (related to Whitehead products).

For $p = 2$ the spectral sequence uses some exact sequences associated to the fibration (James 1957)
$$S^n(2)\rightarrow \Omega S^{n+1}(2)\rightarrow \Omega S^{2n+1}(2),$$
where $\Omega$ stands for a loop space and the (2) is localization of a topological space at the prime 2. This gives a spectral sequence with $E_1^{k,n}$ term equal to
$$\pi_{k+n}(S^{2 n - 1}(2))$$
and converging to $\pi_*^S(2)$ (stable homotopy groups of spheres localized at 2). The spectral sequence has the advantage that the input is previously calculated homotopy groups. It was used by Oda (1977) to calculate the first 31 stable homotopy groups of spheres.

For arbitrary primes one uses some fibrations found by Toda (1962):
$$\widehat S^{2n}(p)\rightarrow \Omega S^{2n+1}(p)\rightarrow \Omega S^{2pn+1}(p)$$
$$S^{2n-1}(p)\rightarrow \Omega \widehat S^{2n}(p)\rightarrow \Omega S^{2pn-1}(p)$$
where $\widehat S^{2n}$ is the $(2np-1)$-skeleton of the loop space $\Omega S^{2n+1}$. (For $p = 2$, the space $\widehat S^{2n}$ is the same as $S^{2n}$, so Toda's fibrations at $p = 2$ are the same as the James fibrations.)
