= Toda–Smith complex =

Computational tool

In mathematics, Toda–Smith complexes are spectra characterized by having a particularly simple BP-homology, and are useful objects in stable homotopy theory.

Toda–Smith complexes provide examples of periodic self maps. These self maps were originally exploited in order to construct infinite families of elements in the homotopy groups of spheres. Their existence pointed the way towards the nilpotence and periodicity theorems.

== Mathematical context ==
The story begins with the degree $p$ map on $S^1$ (as a circle in the complex plane):

$$S^1 \to S^1 \,$$
$$z \mapsto z^p \,$$

The degree $p$ map is well defined for $S^k$ in general, where $k \in \mathbb{N}$. If we apply the infinite suspension functor to this map, $\Sigma^\infty S^1 \to \Sigma^\infty S^1 =: \mathbb{S}^1 \to \mathbb{S}^1$ and we take the cofiber of the resulting map:

$$S \xrightarrow{p} S \to S/p$$

We find that $S/p$ has the remarkable property of coming from a Moore space (i.e., a designer (co)homology space: $H^n(X) \simeq Z/p$, and $\tilde{H}^*(X)$ is trivial for all $* \neq n$).

It is also of note that the periodic maps, $\alpha_t$, $\beta_t$, and $\gamma_t$, come from degree maps between the Toda–Smith complexes, $V(0)_k$, $V(1)_k$, and $V_2(k)$ respectively.

== Formal definition ==
The $n$th Toda–Smith complex, $V(n)$ where $n \in -1, 0, 1, 2, 3, \ldots$, is a finite spectrum which satisfies the property that its BP-homology, $BP_*(V(n)) := [\mathbb{S}^0, BP \wedge V(n)]$, is isomorphic to $BP_*/(p, \ldots, v_n)$.

That is, Toda–Smith complexes are completely characterized by their $BP$-local properties, and are defined as any object $V(n)$ satisfying one of the following equations:

$$\begin{align}
BP_*(V(-1)) & \simeq BP_* \\[6pt]
BP_*(V(0)) & \simeq BP_*/p \\[6pt]
BP_*(V(1)) & \simeq BP_*/(p, v_1) \\[2pt]
& {}\,\,\,\vdots
\end{align}$$

It may help the reader to recall that $BP_* = \mathbb{Z}_{(p)}[v_1, v_2, ...]$, $\deg v_i$ = $2(p^i-1)$.

== Examples of Toda–Smith complexes ==
- the sphere spectrum, $BP_*(S^0) \simeq BP_*$, which is $V(-1)$.
- the mod p Moore spectrum, $BP_*(S/p) \simeq BP_*/p$, which is $V(0)$
