= J-homomorphism =

From a homotopy group of a special orthogonal group to a homotopy group of spheres

In mathematics, the J-homomorphism is a mapping from the homotopy groups of the special orthogonal groups to the homotopy groups of spheres. It was defined by George W. Whitehead (1942), extending a construction of Heinz Hopf (1935).

== Definition ==
Whitehead's original homomorphism is defined geometrically, and gives a homomorphism

$$J \colon \pi_r (\mathrm{SO}(q)) \to \pi_{r+q}(S^q)$$

of abelian groups for integers q, and $r \ge 2$. (Hopf defined this for the special case $q = r+1$.)

The J-homomorphism can be defined as follows. An element of the special orthogonal group SO(q) can be regarded as a map

$$S^{q-1}\rightarrow S^{q-1}$$

and the homotopy group $\pi_r(\operatorname{SO}(q))$) consists of homotopy classes of maps from the r-sphere to SO(q). Thus an element of $\pi_r(\operatorname{SO}(q))$ can be represented by a map

$$S^r\times S^{q-1}\rightarrow S^{q-1}$$

Applying the Hopf construction to this gives a map

$$S^{r+q}= S^r*S^{q-1}\rightarrow  S( S^{q-1}) =S^q$$

in $\pi_{r+q}(S^q)$, which Whitehead defined as the image of the element of $\pi_r(\operatorname{SO}(q))$ under the J-homomorphism.

Taking a limit as q tends to infinity gives the stable J-homomorphism in stable homotopy theory:

$$J \colon \pi_r(\mathrm{SO}) \to \pi_r^S ,$$

where $\mathrm{SO}$ is the infinite special orthogonal group, and the right-hand side is the r-th stable stem of the stable homotopy groups of spheres.

== Image of the J-homomorphism ==
The image of the J-homomorphism was described by Frank Adams (1966), assuming the Adams conjecture of Adams (1963) which was proved by Daniel Quillen (1971), as follows. The group $\pi_r(\operatorname{SO})$ is given by Bott periodicity. It is always cyclic; and if r is positive, it is of order 2 if r is 0 or 1 modulo 8, infinite if r is 3 or 7 modulo 8, and order 1 otherwise (Switzer 1975, p. 488). In particular the image of the stable J-homomorphism is cyclic. The stable homotopy groups $\pi_r^S$ are the direct sum of the (cyclic) image of the J-homomorphism, and the kernel of the Adams e-invariant (Adams 1966), a homomorphism from the stable homotopy groups to $\Q/\Z$. If r is 0 or 1 mod 8 and positive, the order of the image is 2 (so in this case the J-homomorphism is injective). If r is 3 or 7 mod 8, the image is a cyclic group of order equal to the denominator of $B_{2n}/4n$, where $B_{2n}$ is a Bernoulli number. In the remaining cases where r is 2, 4, 5, or 6 mod 8 the image is trivial because $\pi_r(\operatorname{SO})$ is trivial.

r	0	1	2	3	4	5	6	7	8	9	10	11	12	13	14	15	16	17
$\pi_r(\operatorname{SO})$	1	2	1	$\Z$	1	1	1	$\Z$	2	2	1	$\Z$	1	1	1	$\Z$	2	2
$|\operatorname{im}(J)|$	1	2	1	24	1	1	1	240	2	2	1	504	1	1	1	480	2	2
$\pi_r^S$	$\Z$	2	2	24	1	1	2	240	2^{2}	2^{3}	6	504	1	3	2^{2}	480×2	2^{2}	2^{4}
$B_{2n}$				^{1}/_{6}				−^{1}/_{30}				^{1}/_{42}				−^{1}/_{30}		

== Applications ==
Michael Atiyah (1961) introduced the group J(X) of a space X, which for X a sphere is the image of the J-homomorphism in a suitable dimension.

The cokernel of the J-homomorphism $J \colon \pi_n(\mathrm{SO}) \to \pi_n^S$ appears in the group Θ_{n} of h-cobordism classes of oriented homotopy n-spheres (Kosinski (1992)).
