= Hopf invariant =

Homotopy invariant of maps between n-spheres

In mathematics, in particular in algebraic topology, the Hopf invariant is a homotopy invariant of certain maps between n-spheres.

== Motivation ==
In 1931 Heinz Hopf used Clifford parallels to construct the Hopf map

$$\eta\colon S^3 \to S^2,$$

and proved that $\eta$ is essential, i.e., not homotopic to the constant map, by using the fact that the linking number of the circles

$$\eta^{-1}(x),\eta^{-1}(y) \subset S^3$$

is equal to 1, for any $x \neq y \in S^2$.

It was later shown that the homotopy group $\pi_3(S^2)$ is the infinite cyclic group generated by $\eta$. In 1951, Jean-Pierre Serre proved that the rational homotopy groups

$$\pi_i(S^n) \otimes \mathbb{Q}$$

for an odd-dimensional sphere ($n$ odd) are zero unless $i$ is equal to 0 or n. However, for an even-dimensional sphere (n even), there is one more bit of infinite cyclic homotopy in degree $2n-1$.

== Definition ==
Let $\varphi \colon S^{2n-1} \to S^n$ be a continuous map (assume $n>1$). Then we can form the cell complex

$$C_\varphi = S^n \cup_\varphi D^{2n},$$

where $D^{2n}$ is a $2n$-dimensional disc attached to $S^n$ via $\varphi$. The cellular chain groups $C^*_\mathrm{cell}(C_\varphi)$ are just freely generated on the $i$-cells in degree $i$, so they are $\mathbb{Z}$ in degree 0, $n$ and $2n$ and zero everywhere else. Cellular (co-)homology is the (co-)homology of this chain complex, and since all boundary homomorphisms must be zero (recall that $n>1$), the cohomology is

$$H^i_\mathrm{cell}(C_\varphi) = \begin{cases} \mathbb{Z} & i=0,n,2n, \\ 0 & \text{otherwise}. \end{cases}$$

Denote the generators of the cohomology groups by

$H^n(C_\varphi) = \langle\alpha\rangle$ and $H^{2n}(C_\varphi) = \langle\beta\rangle.$

For dimensional reasons, all cup-products between those classes must be trivial apart from $\alpha \smile \alpha$. Thus, as a ring, the cohomology is

$$H^*(C_\varphi) = \mathbb{Z}[\alpha,\beta]/\langle \beta\smile\beta = \alpha\smile\beta = 0, \alpha\smile\alpha=h(\varphi)\beta\rangle.$$

The integer $h(\varphi)$ is the Hopf invariant of the map $\varphi$.

== Properties ==
Theorem: The map $h\colon\pi_{2n-1}(S^n)\to\mathbb{Z}$ is a homomorphism. If $n$ is odd, $h$ is trivial (since $\pi_{2n-1}(S^n)$ is torsion). If $n$ is even, the image of $h$ contains $2\mathbb{Z}$. Moreover, the image of the Whitehead product of identity maps equals 2, i. e. $h([i_n, i_n])=2$, where $i_n \colon S^n \to S^n$ is the identity map and $[\,\cdot\,,\,\cdot\,]$ is the Whitehead product.

The Hopf invariant is $1$ for the Hopf maps, where $n=1,2,4,8$, corresponding to the real division algebras $\mathbb{A}=\mathbb{R},\mathbb{C},\mathbb{H},\mathbb{O}$, respectively, and to the fibration $S(\mathbb{A}^2)\to\mathbb{PA}^1$ sending a direction on the sphere to the subspace it spans. It is a theorem, proved first by Frank Adams, and subsequently by Adams and Michael Atiyah with methods of topological K-theory, that these are the only maps with Hopf invariant 1.

== Whitehead integral formula ==
J. H. C. Whitehead has proposed the following integral formula for the Hopf invariant. Given a map $\varphi \colon S^{2n-1} \to S^n$, one considers a volume form $\omega_n$ on $S^n$ such that $\int_{S^n}\omega_n = 1$. Since $d\omega_n = 0$, the pullback $\varphi^* \omega_n$ is a closed differential form: $d(\varphi^* \omega_n) = \varphi^* (d\omega_n) = \varphi^* 0 = 0$. By Poincaré's lemma it is an exact differential form: there exists an $(n - 1)$-form $\eta$ on $S^{2n - 1}$ such that $d\eta = \varphi^* \omega_n$. The Hopf invariant is then given by

$$\int_{S^{2n - 1}} \eta \wedge d \eta.$$

== Generalisations for stable maps ==
A very general notion of the Hopf invariant can be defined, but it requires a certain amount of homotopy theoretic groundwork:

Let $V$ denote a vector space and $V^\infty$ its one-point compactification, i.e. $V \cong \mathbb{R}^k$ and

$V^\infty \cong S^k$ for some $k$.

If $(X,x_0)$ is any pointed space (as it is implicitly in the previous section), and if we take the point at infinity to be the basepoint of $V^\infty$, then we can form the wedge products

$$V^\infty \wedge X.$$

Now let

$$F \colon V^\infty \wedge X \to V^\infty \wedge Y$$

be a stable map, i.e. stable under the reduced suspension functor. The (stable) geometric Hopf invariant of $F$ is

$$h(F) \in \{X, Y \wedge Y\}_{\mathbb{Z}_2},$$

an element of the stable $\mathbb{Z}_2$-equivariant homotopy group of maps from $X$ to $Y \wedge Y$. Here "stable" means "stable under suspension", i.e. the direct limit over $V$ (or $k$, if you will) of the ordinary, equivariant homotopy groups; and the $\mathbb{Z}_2$-action is the trivial action on $X$ and the flipping of the two factors on $Y \wedge Y$. If we let

$$\Delta_X \colon X \to X \wedge X$$

denote the canonical diagonal map and $I$ the identity, then the Hopf invariant is defined by the following:

$$h(F) := (F \wedge F) (I \wedge \Delta_X) - (I \wedge \Delta_Y) (I \wedge F).$$

This map is initially a map from

$V^\infty \wedge V^\infty \wedge X$ to $V^\infty \wedge V^\infty \wedge Y \wedge Y,$

but under the direct limit it becomes the advertised element of the stable homotopy $\mathbb{Z}_2$-equivariant group of maps. There exists also an unstable version of the Hopf invariant $h_V(F)$, for which one must keep track of the vector space $V$.
