= J. Peter May =

American mathematician (Jon Peter May; born 1939)

- Born: September 16, 1939 (age 87); New York
- Education: Swarthmore College (BA); Princeton University (PhD)
- Known for: May spectral sequence, coining the term "operad"
- Awards: Fellow of the AMS, Elias M. Stein mentoring award
- Scientific career
- Fields: Algebraic topology
- Workplaces: Yale University; University of Chicago
- Thesis: The cohomology of restricted Lie algebras and of Hopf algebras: Application to the Steenrod algebra (1964)
- Doctoral advisor: John Moore
- Doctoral students: Mark Behrens; Andrew Blumberg; Dan Isaksen; Fred Cohen; Ib Madsen; Mona Merling; Emily Riehl; Mike Shulman; Zhouli Xu
- Website: www.math.uchicago.edu/~may

Jon Peter May (born September 16, 1939) is an American mathematician working in the fields of algebraic topology, category theory, homotopy theory, and the foundational aspects of spectra. He is known, in particular, for the May spectral sequence and for coining the term operad.

== Education and career ==
May received a Bachelor of Arts degree from Swarthmore College in 1960 and a Doctor of Philosophy degree from Princeton University in 1964. His thesis, written under the direction of John Moore, was titled The cohomology of restricted Lie algebras and of Hopf algebras: Application to the Steenrod algebra.

From 1964 to 1967, May taught at Yale University. He has been a faculty member at the University of Chicago since 1967, and a professor since 1970.

The word "operad" was created by May as a portmanteau of "operations" and "monad".^{α}

== Awards ==
In 2012 he became an inaugural fellow of the American Mathematical Society. He has advised over 60 doctoral students, including Mark Behrens, Andrew Blumberg, Dan Isaksen, Frederick Cohen, Ib Madsen, Mona Merling, Emily Riehl, Michael Shulman, and Zhouli Xu. May received the 2026 AMS Elias M. Stein Mentoring Award for his exceptional mentoring.

== Notes ==
^α May himself has stated that he was partially inspired by his mother's opera singing when coining the term.
