= Timeline of bordism =

This is a timeline of bordism, a topological theory based on the concept of the boundary of a manifold. For context see timeline of manifolds. Jean Dieudonné wrote that cobordism returns to the attempt in 1895 to define homology theory using only (smooth) manifolds.

== Integral theorems ==
Year	Contributors	Event
Late 17th century	Gottfried Wilhelm Leibniz and others	The fundamental theorem of calculus is the basic result in integral calculus in one dimension, and a primal "integral theorem". An antiderivative of a function can be used to evaluate a definite integral over an interval as a signed combination of the antiderivative at the endpoints. A corollary is that if the derivative of a function is zero, the function is constant.
1760s	Joseph-Louis Lagrange	Introduces a transformation of a surface integral to a volume integral. At the time general surface integrals were not defined, and the surface of a cuboid is used, in a problem on sound propagation.
1889	Vito Volterra	Version of Stokes' theorem in n dimensions, using anti-symmetry.
1899	Henri Poincaré	In Les méthodes nouvelles de la mécanique céleste, he introduces a version of Stokes' theorem in n dimensions using what is essentially differential form notation.
1899	Élie Cartan	Definition of the exterior algebra of differential forms in Euclidean space.
c.1900	Mathematical folklore	The situation at the end of the 19th century is that a geometric form of the fundamental theorem of calculus is available, if everything was smooth enough when rigour is required, and in Euclidean space of n dimensions. The result corresponding to setting the derivative equal to zero is to apply it to closed forms, and as such is "mathematical folklore". It is in the nature of a remark that there are integral theorems for submanifolds linked by cobordism. The analogue of the theorem on derivative zero would be for submanifolds $M_1$ and $M_2$ that jointly form the boundary of a manifold N, and a form $\omega$ defined on N with $d\omega = 0$. Then the integrals $I_1$ and $I_2$ of $\omega$ over the $M_j$ are equal. The signed sum seen in the case of a boundary of dimension 0 reflects the need to use orientations on the manifolds, to define integrals.
1931–2	W. V. D. Hodge	The vector calculus of low dimensions is given a place in general tensor calculus, in all dimensions, using differential forms and the Hodge star operator. The codifferential adjoint to the exterior derivative is the general form of divergence operator. Closed forms are dual to forms of divergence 0.

== Cohomology ==
Year	Contributors	Event
1920s	Élie Cartan and Hermann Weyl	Topology of Lie groups.
1931	Georges de Rham	De Rham's theorem: for a compact differential manifold, the chain complex of differential forms computes the real homology groups.
1935–1940	Group effort	The cohomology concept emerges in algebraic topology, contravariant and dual to homology. In the setting of de Rham, cohomology gives classes of equivalent integrands, differing by closed forms; homology classifies regions of integration, up to boundaries. De Rham cohomology becomes a basic tool for smooth manifolds.
1942	Lev Pontryagin	Publishing in full in 1947, Pontryagin founded a new theory of cobordism with the result that a closed manifold that is a boundary has vanishing Stiefel-Whitney numbers. From the folklore Stokes's theorem corollary, cobordism classes of submanifolds are invariant for the integration of closed differential forms; the introduction of algebraic invariants gives the opening for computing with the equivalence relation as something intrinsic.
1940s		Theories of fibre bundles with structure group G; of classifying spaces BG; of characteristic classes such as the Stiefel-Whitney class and Pontryagin class.
1945	Samuel Eilenberg and Norman Steenrod	Eilenberg–Steenrod axioms to characterise homology theory and cohomology, on a class of spaces.
1946	Norman Steenrod	The Steenrod problem. Stated as Problem 25 in a list by Eilenberg compiled in 1946, it asks, given an integral homology class in degree n of a simplicial complex, is it the image by a continuous mapping of the fundamental class of an oriented manifold of dimension n? The preceding question asks for the spherical homology classes to be characterised. The following question asks for a criterion from algebraic topology for an orientable manifold to be a boundary.
1958	Frank Adams	Adams spectral sequence to calculate, potentially, stable homotopy groups from cohomology groups.

== Homotopy theory ==
Year	Contributors	Event
1954	René Thom	Formal definition of cobordism of oriented manifolds, as an equivalence relation. Thom computed, as a ring under disjoint union and cartesian product, the cobordism ring $\mathfrak{N}_*$ of unoriented smooth manifolds; and introduced the ring $\Omega_*$ of oriented smooth manifolds. $\mathfrak{N}_*$ is a polynomial algebra over the field with two elements, with a single generator in each degree, except degrees one less than a power of 2.
1954	René Thom	In modern notation, Thom contributed to the Steenrod problem, by means of a homomorphism $\Phi \colon \Omega^{\mathrm{SO}}_{\ast}(X) \to H_{\ast}(X,\Z)$, the Thom homomorphism. The Thom space construction M reduced the theory to the study of mappings in cohomology $H^\ast(\mathrm{MSO}(k)) \to H^\ast(X)$.
1955	Michel Lazard	Lazard's universal ring, the ring of definition of the universal formal group law in one dimension.
1960	Michael Atiyah	Definition of cobordism groups and bordism groups of a space X.
1969	Daniel Quillen	The formal group law associated to complex cobordism is universal.
