= Timeline of manifolds =

Mathematics timeline

This is a timeline of manifolds, one of the major geometric concepts of mathematics. For further background see history of manifolds and varieties.

== Background ==
Manifolds in contemporary mathematics come in a number of types. These include:

- smooth manifolds, which are basic in calculus in several variables, mathematical analysis and differential geometry;
- piecewise-linear manifolds;
- topological manifolds.

There are also related classes, such as homology manifolds and orbifolds, that resemble manifolds. It took a generation for clarity to emerge, after the initial work of Henri Poincaré, on the fundamental definitions; and a further generation to discriminate more exactly between the three major classes. Low-dimensional topology (i.e., dimensions 3 and 4, in practice) turned out to be more resistant than the higher dimension, in clearing up Poincaré's legacy. Further developments brought in fresh geometric ideas, concepts from quantum field theory, and heavy use of category theory.

Participants in the first phase of axiomatization were influenced by David Hilbert: with Hilbert's axioms as exemplary, by Hilbert's third problem as solved by Dehn, one of the actors, by Hilbert's fifteenth problem from the needs of 19th century geometry. The subject matter of manifolds is a strand common to algebraic topology, differential topology and geometric topology.

== Timeline to 1900 and Henri Poincaré ==
Year	Contributors	Event
18th century	Leonhard Euler	Euler's theorem on polyhedra "triangulating" the 2-sphere. The subdivision of a convex polygon with n sides into n triangles, by means of any internal point, adds n edges, one vertex and n - 1 faces, preserving the result. So the case of triangulations proper implies the general result.
1820–3	János Bolyai	Develops non-Euclidean geometry, in particular the hyperbolic plane.
1822	Jean-Victor Poncelet	Reconstructs real projective geometry, including the real projective plane.
c.1825	Joseph Diez Gergonne, Jean-Victor Poncelet	Geometric properties of the complex projective plane.
1840	Hermann Grassmann	General n-dimensional linear spaces.
1848	Carl Friedrich Gauss; Pierre Ossian Bonnet	Gauss–Bonnet theorem for the differential geometry of closed surfaces.
1851	Bernhard Riemann	Introduction of the Riemann surface into the theory of analytic continuation. Riemann surfaces are complex manifolds of dimension 1, in this setting presented as ramified covering spaces of the Riemann sphere (the complex projective line).
1854	Bernhard Riemann	Riemannian metrics give an idea of intrinsic geometry of manifolds of any dimension.
1861	Folklore result since c.1850	First conventional publication of the Kelvin–Stokes theorem, in three dimensions, relating integrals over a volume to those on its boundary.
1870s	Sophus Lie	The Lie group concept is developed, using local formulae.
1872	Felix Klein	Klein's Erlangen program puts an emphasis on the homogeneous spaces for the classical groups, as a class of manifolds foundational for geometry.
later 1870s	Ulisse Dini	Dini develops the implicit function theorem, the basic tool for constructing manifolds locally as the zero sets of smooth functions.
from 1890s	Élie Cartan	Formulation of Hamiltonian mechanics in terms of the cotangent bundle of a manifold, the configuration space.
1894	Henri Poincaré	Fundamental group of a topological space. The Poincaré conjecture can now be formulated.
1895	Henri Poincaré	Simplicial homology.
1895	Henri Poincaré	Fundamental work Analysis situs, the beginning of algebraic topology. The basic form of Poincaré duality for an orientable manifold (compact) is formulated as the central symmetry of the Betti numbers.

== 1900 to 1920 ==
Year	Contributors	Event
1900	David Hilbert	Hilbert's fifth problem posed the question of characterising Lie groups among transformation groups, an issue partially resolved in the 1950s. Hilbert's fifteenth problem required a rigorous approach to the Schubert calculus, a branch of intersection theory taking place on the complex Grassmannian manifolds.
1902	David Hilbert	Tentative axiomatisation (topological spaces are not yet defined) of two-dimensional manifolds.
1905	Max Dehn	As a conjecture, the Dehn-Somerville equations relating numerically triangulated manifolds and simplicial polytopes.
1907	Henri Poincaré, Paul Koebe	The uniformization theorem for simply connected Riemann surfaces.
1907	Max Dehn, Poul Heegaard	Survey article Analysis Situs in Klein's encyclopedia gives the first proof of the classification of surfaces, conditional on the existence of a triangulation, and lays the foundations of combinatorial topology. The work also contained a combinatorial definition of "topological manifold", a subject in definitional flux up to the 1930s.
1908	Heinrich Franz Friedrich Tietze	Habilitationschrift for the University of Vienna, proposes another tentative definition, by combinatorial means, of "topological manifold".
1908	Ernst Steinitz, Tietze	The Hauptvermutung, a conjecture on the existence of a common refinement of two triangulations. This was an open problem, for manifolds, to 1961.
1910	L. E. J. Brouwer	Brouwer's theorem on invariance of domain has the corollary that a connected, non-empty manifold has a definite dimension. This result had been an open problem for three decades. In the same year Brouwer gives the first example of a topological group that is not a Lie group.
1912	L. E. J. Brouwer	Brouwer publishes on the degree of a continuous mapping, foreshadowing the fundamental class concept for orientable manifolds.
1913	Hermann Weyl	Die Idee der Riemannschen Fläche gives a model definition of the idea of manifold, in the one-dimensional complex case.
1915	Oswald Veblen	The "method of cutting", a combinatorial approach to surfaces, presented in a Princeton seminar. It is used for the 1921 proof of the classification of surfaces by Henry Roy Brahana.

== 1920 to the 1945 axioms for homology ==
Year	Contributors	Event
1923	Hermann Künneth	Künneth formula for homology of product of spaces.
1926	Hellmuth Kneser	Defines "topological manifold" as a second countable Hausdorff space, with points having neighbourhoods homeomorphic to open balls; and "combinatorial manifold" in an inductive fashion depending on a cell complex definition and the Hauptvermutung.
1926	Élie Cartan	Classification of symmetric spaces, a class of homogeneous spaces.
1926	Tibor Radó	Two-dimensional topological manifolds have triangulations.
1926	Heinz Hopf	Poincaré–Hopf theorem, the sum of the indexes of a vector field with isolated zeroes on a compact differential manifold M is equal to the Euler characteristic of M.
1926−7	Otto Schreier	Definitions of topological group and of "continuous group" (traditional term, ultimately Lie group) as a locally Euclidean topological group. He also introduces the universal cover in this context.
1928	Leopold Vietoris	Definition of h-manifold, by combinatorial means, by proof analysis applied to Poincaré duality.
1929	Egbert van Kampen	In his dissertation, by means of star-complexes for simplicial complexes, recovers Poincaré duality in a combinatorial setting.
1930	Bartel Leendert van der Waerden	Pursuing the goal of foundations for the Schubert calculus in enumerative geometry, he examined the Poincaré-Lefschetz intersection theory for its version of intersection number, in a 1930 paper (given the triangulability of algebraic varieties). In the same year, he published a note Kombinatorische Topologie on a talk for the Deutsche Mathematiker-Vereinigung, in which he surveyed definitions for "topological manifold" so far given, by eight authors.
c.1930	Emmy Noether	Module theory and general chain complexes are developed by Noether and her students, and algebraic topology begins as an axiomatic approach grounded in abstract algebra.
1931	Georges de Rham	De Rham's theorem: for a compact differential manifold, the chain complex of differential forms computes the real (co)homology groups.
1931	Heinz Hopf	Introduces the Hopf fibration, $S^1\to S^3\to S^2$.
1931–2	Oswald Veblen, J. H. C. Whitehead	Whitehead's 1931 thesis, The Representation of Projective Spaces, written with Veblen as advisor, gives an intrinsic and axiomatic view of manifolds as Hausdorff spaces subject to certain axioms. It was followed by the joint book Foundations of Differential Geometry (1932). The "chart" concept of Poincaré, a local coordinate system, is organised into the atlas; in this setting, regularity conditions may be applied to the transition functions. This foundational point of view allows for a pseudogroup restriction on the transition functions, for example to introduce piecewise linear structures.
1932	Eduard Čech	Čech cohomology.
1933	Solomon Lefschetz	Singular homology of topological spaces.
1934	Marston Morse	Morse theory relates the real homology of compact differential manifolds to the critical points of a Morse function.
1935	Hassler Whitney	Proof of the embedding theorem, stating that a smooth manifold of dimension n may be embedded in Euclidean space of dimension 2n.
1941	Witold Hurewicz	First fundamental theorem of homological algebra: Given a short exact sequence of spaces there exist a connecting homomorphism such that the long sequence of cohomology groups of the spaces is exact.
1942	Lev Pontryagin	Publishing in full in 1947, Pontryagin founded a new theory of cobordism with the result that a closed manifold that is a boundary has vanishing Stiefel-Whitney numbers. From Stokes's theorem cobordism classes of submanifolds are invariant for the integration of closed differential forms; the introduction of algebraic invariants gave the opening for computing with the equivalence relation as something intrinsic.
1943	Werner Gysin	Gysin sequence and Gysin homomorphism.
1943	Norman Steenrod	Homology with local coefficients.
1944	Samuel Eilenberg	"Modern" definition of singular homology and singular cohomology.
1945	Beno Eckmann	Defines the cohomology ring building on Heinz Hopf's work. In the case of manifolds, there are multiple interpretations of the ring product, including wedge product of differential forms, and cup product representing intersecting cycles.

== 1945 to 1960 ==
Terminology: By this period manifolds are generally assumed to be those of Veblen-Whitehead, so locally Euclidean Hausdorff spaces, but the application of countability axioms was also becoming standard. Veblen-Whitehead did not assume, as Kneser earlier had, that manifolds are second countable. The term "separable manifold", to distinguish second countable manifolds, survived into the late 1950s.

Year	Contributors	Event
1945	Saunders Mac Lane–Samuel Eilenberg	Foundation of category theory: axioms for categories, functors, and natural transformations.
1945	Norman Steenrod–Samuel Eilenberg	Eilenberg–Steenrod axioms for homology and cohomology.
1945	Jean Leray	Founds sheaf theory. For Leray a sheaf was a map assigning a module or a ring to a closed subspace of a topological space. The first example was the sheaf assigning to a closed subspace its p-th cohomology group.
1945	Jean Leray	Defines sheaf cohomology.
1946	Jean Leray	Invents spectral sequences, a method for iteratively approximating cohomology groups.
1948	Cartan seminar	Writes up sheaf theory.
c.1949	Norman Steenrod	The Steenrod problem, of representation of homology classes by fundamental classes of manifolds, can be solved by means of pseudomanifolds (and later, formulated via cobordism theory).
1950	Henri Cartan	In the sheaf theory notes from the Cartan seminar he defines: Sheaf space (étale space), support of sheaves axiomatically, sheaf cohomology with support. "The most natural proof of Poincaré duality is obtained by means of sheaf theory."
1950	Samuel Eilenberg–Joseph A. Zilber	Simplicial sets as a purely algebraic model of well behaved topological spaces.
1950	Charles Ehresmann	Ehresmann's fibration theorem states that a smooth, proper, surjective submersion between smooth manifolds is a locally trivial fibration.
1951	Henri Cartan	Definition of sheaf theory, with a sheaf defined using open subsets (rather than closed subsets) of a topological space. Sheaves connect local and global properties of topological spaces.
1952	René Thom	The Thom isomorphism brings cobordism of manifolds into the ambit of homotopy theory.
1952	Edwin E. Moise	Moise's theorem established that a 3-dimension compact connected topological manifold is a PL manifold (earlier terminology "combinatorial manifold"), having a unique PL structure. In particular it is triangulable. This result is now known to extend no further into higher dimensions.
1956	John Milnor	The first exotic spheres were constructed by Milnor in dimension 7, as $S^3$-bundles over $S^4$. He showed that there are at least 7 differentiable structures on the 7-sphere.
1960	John Milnor and Sergei Novikov	The ring of cobordism classes of stably complex manifolds is a polynomial ring on infinitely many generators of positive even degrees.

== 1961 to 1970 ==
Year	Contributors	Event
1961	Stephen Smale	Proof of the generalized Poincaré conjecture in dimensions greater than four.
1962	Stephen Smale	Proof of the h-cobordism theorem in dimensions greater than four, based on the Whitney trick.
1963	Michel Kervaire–John Milnor	The classification of exotic spheres: the monoid of smooth structures on the n-sphere is the collection of oriented smooth n-manifolds which are homeomorphic to $S^n$, taken up to orientation-preserving diffeomorphism, with connected sum as the monoid operation. For $n\ne 4$, this monoid is a group, and is isomorphic to the group $\Theta_n$ of h-cobordism classes of oriented homotopy n-spheres, which is finite and abelian.
1965	Dennis Barden	Completes the classification of simply connected, compact 5-manifolds, started by Smale in 1962.
1967	Friedhelm Waldhausen	Defines and classifies 3-dimensional graph manifolds.
1968	Robion Kirby and Laurent C. Siebenmann	In dimension at least five, the Kirby–Siebenmann class is the only obstruction to a topological manifold having a PL structure.
1969	Laurent C. Siebenmann	Example of two homeomorphic PL manifolds that are not piecewise-linearly homeomorphic. The maximal atlas approach to structures on manifolds had clarified the Hauptvermutung for a topological manifold M, as a trichotomy. M might have no triangulation, hence no piecewise-linear maximal atlas; it might have a unique PL structure; or it might have more than one maximal atlas, and so more than one PL structure. The status of the conjecture, that the second option was always the case, became clarified at this point in the form that each of the three cases might apply, depending on M. The "combinatorial triangulation conjecture" stated that the first case could not occur, for M compact. The Kirby–Siebenmann result disposed of the conjecture. Siebenmann's example showed the third case is also possible.
1970	John Conway	Skein theory of knots: The computation of knot invariants by skein modules. Skein modules can be based on quantum invariants.

== 1971–1980 ==
Year	Contributors	Event
1974	Shiing-Shen Chern–James Simons	Chern–Simons theory: A particular TQFT which describe knot and manifold invariants, at that time only in 3D
1978	Francois Bayen–Moshe Flato–Chris Fronsdal–André Lichnerowicz–Daniel Sternheimer	Deformation quantization, later to be a part of categorical quantization

== 1981–1990 ==
Year	Contributors	Event
circa 1983	Simon Donaldson	Simon Donaldson introduces self-dual connections into the theory of smooth 4-manifolds, revolutionizing the 4-dimensional geometry, and relating it to mathematical physics. Many of his results were later published in his joint monograph with Kronheimer in 1990. See more under the Donaldson theory.
circa 1983	William Thurston	William Thurston proves that all Haken 3-manifolds are hyperbolic, which gives a proof of the Thurston's Hyperbolization theorem, thus starting a revolution in the study of 3-manifolds. See also under Hyperbolization theorem, and Geometrization conjecture
1984	Vladimir Bazhanov–Razumov Stroganov	Bazhanov–Stroganov d-simplex equation generalizing the Yang–Baxter equation and the Zamolodchikov equation
circa 1985	Andrew Casson	Andrew Casson introduces the Casson invariant for homology 3-spheres, bringing the whole new set of ideas into the 3-dimensional topology, and relating the geometry of 3-manifolds with the geometry of representation spaces of the fundamental group of a 2-manifold. This leads to a direct connection with mathematical physics. See more under Casson invariant.
1986	Joachim Lambek–Phil Scott	So-called Fundamental theorem of topology: The section-functor Γ and the germ-functor Λ establish a dual adjunction between the category of presheaves and the category of bundles (over the same topological space) which restricts to a dual equivalence of categories (or duality) between corresponding full subcategories of sheaves and of étale bundles
1986	Peter Freyd–David Yetter	Constructs the (compact braided) monoidal category of tangles
1986	Vladimir Drinfel'd–Michio Jimbo	Quantum groups: In other words, quasitriangular Hopf algebras. The point is that the categories of representations of quantum groups are tensor categories with extra structure. They are used in construction of quantum invariants of knots and links and low dimensional manifolds, among other applications.
1987	Vladimir Turaev	Starts quantum topology by using quantum groups and R-matrices to giving an algebraic unification of most of the known knot polynomials. Especially important was Vaughan Jones and Edward Witten's work on the Jones polynomial.
circa 1988	Andreas Floer	Andreas Floer introduces instanton homology.
1988	Graeme Segal	Elliptic objects: A functor that is a categorified version of a vector bundle equipped with a connection, it is a 2D parallel transport for strings.
1988	Graeme Segal	Conformal field theory: A symmetric monoidal functor $Z\colon \operatorname{nCob}_{\mathbb{C}}\to \operatorname{Hilb}$ satisfying some axioms
1988	Edward Witten	Topological quantum field theory (TQFT): A monoidal functor $Z\colon \operatorname{nCob}\to \operatorname{Hilb}$ satisfying some axioms
1988	Edward Witten	Topological string theory
1989	Edward Witten	Understanding of the Jones polynomial using Chern–Simons theory, leading to invariants for 3-manifolds
1990	Nicolai Reshetikhin–Vladimir Turaev–Edward Witten	Reshetikhin–Turaev-Witten invariants of knots from modular tensor categories of representations of quantum groups.

== 1991–2000 ==
Year	Contributors	Event
1991	André Joyal–Ross Street	Formalization of Penrose string diagrams to calculate with abstract tensors in various monoidal categories with extra structure. The calculus now depends on the connection with low dimensional topology.
1992	Vladimir Turaev	Modular tensor categories. Special tensor categories that arise in constructing knot invariants, in constructing TQFTs and CFTs, as truncation (semisimple quotient) of the category of representations of a quantum group (at roots of unity), as categories of representations of weak Hopf algebras, as category of representations of a RCFT.
1992	Vladimir Turaev–Oleg Viro	Turaev–Viro state sum models based on spherical categories (the first state sum models) and Turaev–Viro state sum invariants for 3-manifolds.
1992	Vladimir Turaev	Shadow world of links: Shadows of links give shadow invariants of links by shadow state sums.
1993	Ruth Lawrence	Extended TQFTs
1993	David Yetter–Louis Crane	Crane–Yetter state sum models based on ribbon categories and Crane–Yetter state sum invariants for 4-manifolds.
1993	Kenji Fukaya	A_{∞}-categories and A_{∞}-functors. A_{∞}-categories can also be viewed as noncommutative formal dg-manifolds with a closed marked subscheme of objects.
1993	John Barret-Bruce Westbury	Spherical categories: Monoidal categories with duals for diagrams on spheres instead for in the plane.
1993	Maxim Kontsevich	Kontsevich invariants for knots (are perturbation expansion Feynman integrals for the Witten functional integral) defined by the Kontsevich integral. They are the universal Vassiliev invariants for knots.
1993	Daniel Freed	A new view on TQFT using modular tensor categories that unifies 3 approaches to TQFT (modular tensor categories from path integrals).
1994	Peter Kronheimer, Tomasz Mrowka	Kronheimer and Mrowka introduce the idea of "canonical classes" in the cohomology of simple smooth 4-manifolds which hypothetically allow one to compute the Donaldson invariants of smooth 4-manifolds. See more under the Kronheimer–Mrowka basic class.
1994	Nathan Seiberg and Edward Witten	Nathan Seiberg and Edward Witten introduce new invariants for smooth oriented 4-manifolds. Like Donaldson, they are motivated by mathematical physics, but their invariants are easier to work with than the Donaldson invariants. See more under the Seiberg–Witten invariants and Seiberg–Witten theory.
1994	Maxim Kontsevich	Formulates homological mirror symmetry conjecture: X a compact symplectic manifold with first chern class c_{1}(X) = 0 and Y a compact Calabi–Yau manifold are mirror pairs if and only if D(Fuk_{X}) (the derived category of the Fukaya triangulated category of X concocted out of Lagrangian cycles with local systems) is equivalent to a subcategory of D^{b}(Coh_{Y}) (the bounded derived category of coherent sheaves on Y).
1994	Louis Crane–Igor Frenkel	Hopf categories and construction of 4D TQFTs by them. Identifies k-tuply monoidal n-categories. It mirrors the table of homotopy groups of the spheres.
1995	John Baez–James Dolan	Outline a program in which n-dimensional TQFTs are described as n-category representations.
1995	John Baez–James Dolan	Proposes n-dimensional deformation quantization.
1995	John Baez–James Dolan	Tangle hypothesis: The n-category of framed n-tangles in $n+k$ dimensions is $(n+k)$-equivalent to the free weak k-tuply monoidal n-category with duals on one object.
1995	John Baez–James Dolan	Cobordism hypothesis (Extended TQFT hypothesis I): The n-category of which n-dimensional extended TQFTs are representations nCob is the free stable weak n-category with duals on one object.
1995	John Baez–James Dolan	Extended TQFT hypothesis II: An n-dimensional unitary extended TQFT is a weak n-functor, preserving all levels of duality, from the free stable weak n-category with duals on one object to nHilb.
1995	Valentin Lychagin	Categorical quantization
1997	Maxim Kontsevich	Formal deformation quantization theorem: Every Poisson manifold admits a differentiable star product and they are classified up to equivalence by formal deformations of the Poisson structure.
1998	Richard Thomas	Thomas, a student of Simon Donaldson, introduces Donaldson–Thomas invariants which are systems of numerical invariants of complex oriented 3-manifolds X, analogous to Donaldson invariants in the theory of 4-manifolds.
1998	Maxim Kontsevich	Calabi–Yau categories: A linear category with a trace map for each object of the category and an associated symmetric (with respects to objects) nondegenerate pairing to the trace map. If X is a smooth projective Calabi–Yau variety of dimension d then $D^b(\operatorname{Coh}(X))$ is a unital Calabi–Yau A_{∞}-category of Calabi–Yau dimension d. A Calabi–Yau category with one object is a Frobenius algebra.
1999	Joseph Bernstein–Igor Frenkel–Mikhail Khovanov	Temperley–Lieb categories: Objects are enumerated by nonnegative integers. The set of homomorphisms from object n to object m is a free R-module with a basis over a ring $R$, where $R$ is given by the isotopy classes of systems of $(n|+|m|)/2$ simple pairwise disjoint arcs inside a horizontal strip on the plane that connect in pairs |n| points on the bottom and |m| points on the top in some order. Morphisms are composed by concatenating their diagrams. Temperley–Lieb categories are categorized Temperley–Lieb algebras.
1999	Moira Chas–Dennis Sullivan	Constructs string topology by cohomology. This is string theory on general topological manifolds.
1999	Mikhail Khovanov	Khovanov homology: A homology theory for knots such that the dimensions of the homology groups are the coefficients of the Jones polynomial of the knot.
1999	Vladimir Turaev	Homotopy quantum field theory (HQFT)
1999	Ronald Brown–George Janelidze	2-dimensional Galois theory.
2000	Yakov Eliashberg–Alexander Givental–Helmut Hofer	Symplectic field theory SFT: A functor $Z$ from a geometric category of framed Hamiltonian structures and framed cobordisms between them to an algebraic category of certain differential D-modules and Fourier integral operators between them and satisfying some axioms.

== 2001–present ==
Year	Contributors	Event
2003	Grigori Perelman	Perelman's proof of the Poincaré conjecture in dimension 3 using Ricci flow. The proof is more general.
2004	Stephen Stolz–Peter Teichner	Definition of nD quantum field theory of degree p parametrized by a manifold.
2004	Stephen Stolz–Peter Teichner	Program to construct Topological modular forms as a moduli space of supersymmetric Euclidean field theories. They conjectured a Stolz–Teichner picture (analogy) between classifying spaces of cohomology theories in the chromatic filtration (de Rham cohomology, K-theory, Morava K-theories) and moduli spaces of supersymmetric QFTs parametrized by a manifold (proved in 0D and 1D).
2005	Peter Ozsváth–Zoltán Szabó	Knot Floer homology
2008	Bruce Bartlett	Primacy of the point hypothesis: An n-dimensional unitary extended TQFT is completely described by the n-Hilbert space it assigns to a point. This is a reformulation of the cobordism hypothesis.
2008	Michael Hopkins–Jacob Lurie	Sketch of proof of the Baez–Dolan tangle hypothesis and the Baez–Dolan cobordism hypothesis, which classify extended TQFT in all dimensions.
2016	Ciprian Manolescu	Refutation of the "triangulation conjecture", with the proof that in dimension at least five, there exists a compact topological manifold not homeomorphic to a simplicial complex.

== See also ==
- differentiable stack
- factorization homology
- Kuranishi theory
- Floer homology
- Glossary of algebraic topology
- Timeline of bordism
