= Landweber =

Landweber is a surname. Notable people with the surname include:

- Lawrence Landweber, American computer scientist
- Laura Landweber, American evolutionary biologist
- Louis Landweber (1912 – 1998), American ship hydrodynamicist
  - Landweber iteration in numerical mathematics
- Peter Landweber (born 1940), American mathematician working in algebraic topology
