= Landweber exact functor theorem =

Theorem relating to algebraic topology

In mathematics, the Landweber exact functor theorem, named after Peter Landweber, is a theorem in algebraic topology. It is known that a complex orientation of a homology theory leads to a formal group law. The Landweber exact functor theorem (or LEFT for short) can be seen as a method to reverse this process: it constructs a homology theory out of a formal group law.

== Statement ==
The coefficient ring of complex cobordism is $MU_*(*) = MU_* \cong \Z[x_1,x_2,\dots]$, where the degree of $x_i$ is $2i$. This is isomorphic to the graded Lazard ring $\mathcal{}L_*$. This means that giving a formal group law F (of degree $-2$) over a graded ring $R_*$ is equivalent to giving a graded ring morphism $L_*\to R_*$. Multiplication by an integer $n>0$ is defined inductively as a power series, by

$[n+1]^F x = F(x, [n]^F x)$ and $[1]^F x = x.$

Let now F be a formal group law over a ring $\mathcal{}R_*$. Define for a topological space X

$$E_*(X) = MU_*(X)\otimes_{MU_*}R_*$$

Here $R_*$ gets its $MU_*$-algebra structure via F. The question is: is E a homology theory? It is obviously a homotopy invariant functor, which fulfills excision. The problem is that tensoring in general does not preserve exact sequences. One could demand that $R_*$ be flat over $MU_*$, but that would be too strong in practice. Peter Landweber found another criterion:

Theorem (Landweber exact functor theorem)
For every prime p, there are elements $v_1,v_2,\dots \in MU_*$ such that we have the following: Suppose that $M_*$ is a graded $MU_*$-module and the sequence $(p,v_1,v_2,\dots, v_n)$ is regular for $M$, for every p and n. Then

$$E_*(X) = MU_*(X)\otimes_{MU_*}M_*$$

is a homology theory on CW-complexes.

In particular, every formal group law F over a ring $R$ yields a module over $\mathcal{}MU_*$ since we get via F a ring morphism $MU_*\to R$.

== Remarks ==
- There is also a version for Brown–Peterson cohomology BP. The spectrum BP is a direct summand of $MU_{(p)}$ with coefficients $\Z_{(p)}[v_1,v_2,\dots]$. The statement of the LEFT stays true if one fixes a prime p and substitutes BP for MU.
- The classical proof of the LEFT uses the Landweber–Morava invariant ideal theorem: the only prime ideals of $BP_*$ which are invariant under coaction of $BP_*BP$ are the $I_n = (p,v_1,\dots, v_n)$. This allows to check flatness only against the $BP_*/I_n$ (see Landweber, 1976).
- The LEFT can be strengthened as follows: let $\mathcal{E}_*$ be the (homotopy) category of Landweber exact $MU_*$-modules and $\mathcal{E}$ the category of MU-module spectra M such that $\pi_*M$ is Landweber exact. Then the functor $\pi_*\colon\mathcal{E}\to \mathcal{E}_*$ is an equivalence of categories. The inverse functor (given by the LEFT) takes $\mathcal{}MU_*$-algebras to (homotopy) MU-algebra spectra (see Hovey, Strickland, 1999, Thm 2.7).

== Examples ==
The archetypical and first known (non-trivial) example is complex K-theory K. Complex K-theory is complex oriented and has as formal group law $x+y+xy$. The corresponding morphism $MU_*\to K_*$ is also known as the Todd genus. We have then an isomorphism

$$K_*(X) = MU_*(X)\otimes_{MU_*}K_*,$$

called the Conner–Floyd isomorphism.

While complex K-theory was constructed before by geometric means, many homology theories were first constructed via the Landweber exact functor theorem. This includes elliptic homology, the Johnson–Wilson theories $E(n)$ and the Lubin–Tate spectra $E_n$.

While homology with rational coefficients $H\mathbb{Q}$ is Landweber exact, homology with integer coefficients $H\mathbb{Z}$ is not Landweber exact. Furthermore, Morava K-theory K(n) is not Landweber exact.

== Modern reformulation ==
A module M over $\mathcal{}MU_*$ is the same as a quasi-coherent sheaf $\mathcal{F}$ over $\text{Spec }L$, where L is the Lazard ring. If $M = \mathcal{}MU_*(X)$, then M has the extra datum of a $\mathcal{}MU_*MU$ coaction. A coaction on the ring level corresponds to that $\mathcal{F}$ is an equivariant sheaf with respect to an action of an affine group scheme G. It is a theorem of Quillen that $G \cong \Z[b_1, b_2,\dots]$ and assigns to every ring R the group of power series

$$g(t) = t+b_1t^2+b_2t^3+\cdots\in R[[t]]$$.

It acts on the set of formal group laws $\text{Spec }L(R)$ via

$$F(x,y) \mapsto gF(g^{-1}x, g^{-1}y)$$.

These are just the coordinate changes of formal group laws. Therefore, one can identify the stack quotient $\text{Spec }L // G$ with the stack of (1-dimensional) formal groups $\mathcal{M}_{fg}$ and $M = MU_*(X)$ defines a quasi-coherent sheaf over this stack. Now it is quite easy to see that it suffices that M defines a quasi-coherent sheaf $\mathcal{F}$ which is flat over $\mathcal{M}_{fg}$ in order that $MU_*(X)\otimes_{MU_*}M$ is a homology theory. The Landweber exactness theorem can then be interpreted as a flatness criterion for $\mathcal{M}_{fg}$ (see Lurie 2010).

== Refinements to $E_\infty$-ring spectra ==
While the LEFT is known to produce (homotopy) ring spectra out of $\mathcal{}MU_*$, it is a much more delicate question to understand when these spectra are actually $E_\infty$-ring spectra. As of 2010, the best progress was made by Jacob Lurie. If X is an algebraic stack and $X\to \mathcal{M}_{fg}$ a flat map of stacks, the discussion above shows that we get a presheaf of (homotopy) ring spectra on X. If this map factors over $M_p(n)$ (the stack of 1-dimensional p-divisible groups of height n) and the map $X\to M_p(n)$ is etale, then this presheaf can be refined to a sheaf of $E_\infty$-ring spectra (see Goerss). This theorem is important for the construction of topological modular forms and topological automorphic forms.

== See also ==
- Chromatic homotopy theory
