= Peter Landweber =

American mathematician (born 1940)

Peter Steven Landweber (born August 17, 1940, in Washington D. C.) is an American mathematician working in algebraic topology.

Landweber studied at the University of Iowa (B.S. 1960) and Harvard University (master's degree 1961), where he graduated in 1965 after studying under Raoul Bott (Künneth formulas for bordism theories). He was then Assistant Professor at the University of Virginia (from 1965) and at Yale University from 1968 to 1970. From 1967 to 1968 he was at the Institute for Advanced Study in Princeton, New Jersey. In 1970, he became Associate Professor at Rutgers University, where he taught from 1974 until his retirement in 2007. From 1974 to 1975 he was a NATO fellow at the University of Cambridge. Since 2007, he is a Professor Emeritus at Rutgers University.

Landweber studied complex bordism in algebraic topology (introducing Landweber–Novikov algebra in the 1960s). In the beginning of the 1970s, he proved his exact functor theorem, which allows the construction of a homology theory from a formal group law. In 1986 he introduced elliptic cohomology with Douglas C. Ravenel and Robert E. Stong, which is a generalized cohomology theory with applications to modular forms and elliptic curves. From 1989 to 1992 he was Chairman of the Russian translation Committee of the American Mathematical Society. He is also a fellow of the society.

Peter Landweber is the elder son of the engineer Louis Landweber and the father of the molecular biologist Laura Faye Landweber (born 1967) and of the mathematician Gregory David Landweber (born 1971).

== Selected publications ==
- (Ed.): elliptic curves and modular forms in algebraic topology (= lecture notes in mathematics. ) issue 1326). Springer 1988 (proceedings of a Conference at the Institute for Advanced Study in 1986). Landweber: other elliptic and modular forms. PP. 55–86; Elliptic genera-of introductory overview. pg. 1–10.
