= Agnès Beaudry =

Canadian mathematician

Agnès France Marie Beaudry is a Canadian mathematician specializing in algebraic topology, including stable homotopy theory, chromatic homotopy theory, equivariant homotopy theory, and applications of these theories to condensed matter physics. She is an associate professor of mathematics at the University of Colorado Boulder.

== Education and career ==
Beaudry majored in mathematics at McGill University in Canada, with a minor in philosophy. After graduating in 2008, she went to Northwestern University for doctoral study in mathematics. She completed her Ph.D. in 2013, with the dissertation The Duality Resolution Spectral Sequence for the Moore Spectrum at the Prime 2 supervised by Paul Goerss.

After working at the University of Chicago from 2013 to 2016 as an L. E. Dickson Instructor in mathematics, she joined the Department of Mathematics at the University of Colorado as an assistant professor in 2016. She was promoted to associate professor in 2022.

== Recognition ==
Beaudry was elected as a Fellow of the American Mathematical Society in the 2024 class of fellows.
