= Wu Jin =

Taiwanese civil and hydraulic engineer (1934–2008)

- 吳京
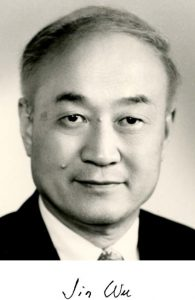

Minister of Education of the Republic of China
- In office 10 June 1996 – 9 February 1998
- Preceded by: Kuo Wei-fan
- Succeeded by: Lin Ching-chiang

President of National Cheng Kung University
- In office 1994–1996
- Preceded by: Ma Che-ju
- Succeeded by: Huang Ting-chia

Personal details
- Born: April 9, 1934 Nanjing, Republic of China
- Died: 14 January 2008 (aged 73) Tainan City, Taiwan
- Education: National Cheng Kung University (BS); University of Iowa (MS, PhD)
- Scientific career
- Fields: Hydraulic engineering Mechanical engineering
- Thesis: Measurement of viscous drag of ship forms (1964)
- Doctoral advisor: Louis Landweber

Chinese name
- Traditional Chinese: 吳京
Transcriptions
Standard Mandarin
- Hanyu Pinyin: Wú Jīng
Southern Min
- Hokkien POJ: Ngô͘ Keng
- Tâi-lô: Ngôo King

Wu Jin (Chinese: 吳京; pinyin: Wú Jīng; Pe̍h-ōe-jī: Ngô͘ Keng; 9 April 1934 – 14 January 2008) was a Taiwanese civil, mechanical, and hydraulic engineer who served as Minister for Education between 1996 and 1998 under President Lee Teng-hui.

== Early life and career ==
Wu was born in Nanjing on 9 April 1934. After moving to Taiwan, he graduated from National Cheng Kung University with a bachelor's degree in civil engineering in 1956. He then completed graduate studies in the United States, earning a Master of Science (M.S.) in 1961 and his Ph.D. in 1964, both from the University of Iowa in mechanical engineering and hydraulic engineering. His doctoral dissertation, completed under Louis Landweber, was titled, "The measurement of viscous drag of ship forms".

After receiving his doctorate, Wu was a research fellow at Academia Sinica in 1986 and was elected a member of Academia Sinica in the same year. In 1995, Wu was elected to the United States National Academy of Engineering.

Upon graduating from the University of Iowa, Wu worked for Hydronautics, Inc. as a research scientist within the Fluid Motions Division, and in 1966, became head of that division. In 1972, Wu was promoted again, to lead the Hawaii-based Geophysical Fluid Dynamics Division. Wu joined the University of Delaware faculty in 1974, and held the H. Fletcher Brown Professorship in Marine Studies and Civil Engineering from 1980 to 1998. In Taiwan, he served as the president of National Cheng Kung University (NCKU) from 1994 to 1996.

== Minister for Education ==
Wu was selected by President Lee Teng-hui to serve as Taiwan's education minister in June 1996. He was known for his progressive views on the reforms needed in Taiwan's educational system.

Wu stepped down as Minister for Education in February 1998. His resignation was due to a difference of opinion dispute between himself and the president of Academia Sinica, Lee Yuan-tseh, over the pace and types of educational reforms needed. (Lee Yuan-tseh had previously chaired a panel force in the 1980s which had led to a number of changes concerning education in Taiwan.)

== Death ==
Wu Jin was diagnosed with cancer of the ampulla of Vater, a rare form of the disease, in 2006. He received treatment at the National Cheng Kung University Hospital in Taiwan and the United States.

Wu's health began to deteriorate in December 2007 following a trip to Mainland China. He died on 14 January 2008 at National Cheng Kung University Hospital in Tainan, Taiwan, at the age of 74. Wu was survived by his wife, Tzu-Chen C. Wu. His funeral took place in Tainan on 27 January 2008.
