= Nilpotence theorem =

On when an element of the coefficient ring of a ring spectrum is nilpotent

In algebraic topology, the nilpotence theorem gives a condition for an element in the homotopy groups of a ring spectrum to be nilpotent, in terms of the complex cobordism spectrum $\mathrm{MU}$. More precisely, it states that for any ring spectrum $R$, the kernel of the map $\pi_\ast R \to \mathrm{MU}_\ast(R)$ consists of nilpotent elements. It was conjectured by Douglas Ravenel (1984) and proved by Ethan S. Devinatz, Michael J. Hopkins, and Jeffrey H. Smith (1988).

== Nishida's theorem ==
Goro Nishida (1973) showed that elements of positive degree of the homotopy groups of spheres are nilpotent. This is a special case of the nilpotence theorem.

== See also ==
- Ravenel's conjectures
