= Tomer Schlank =

Israeli mathematician (born 1982)

- תומר שלנק
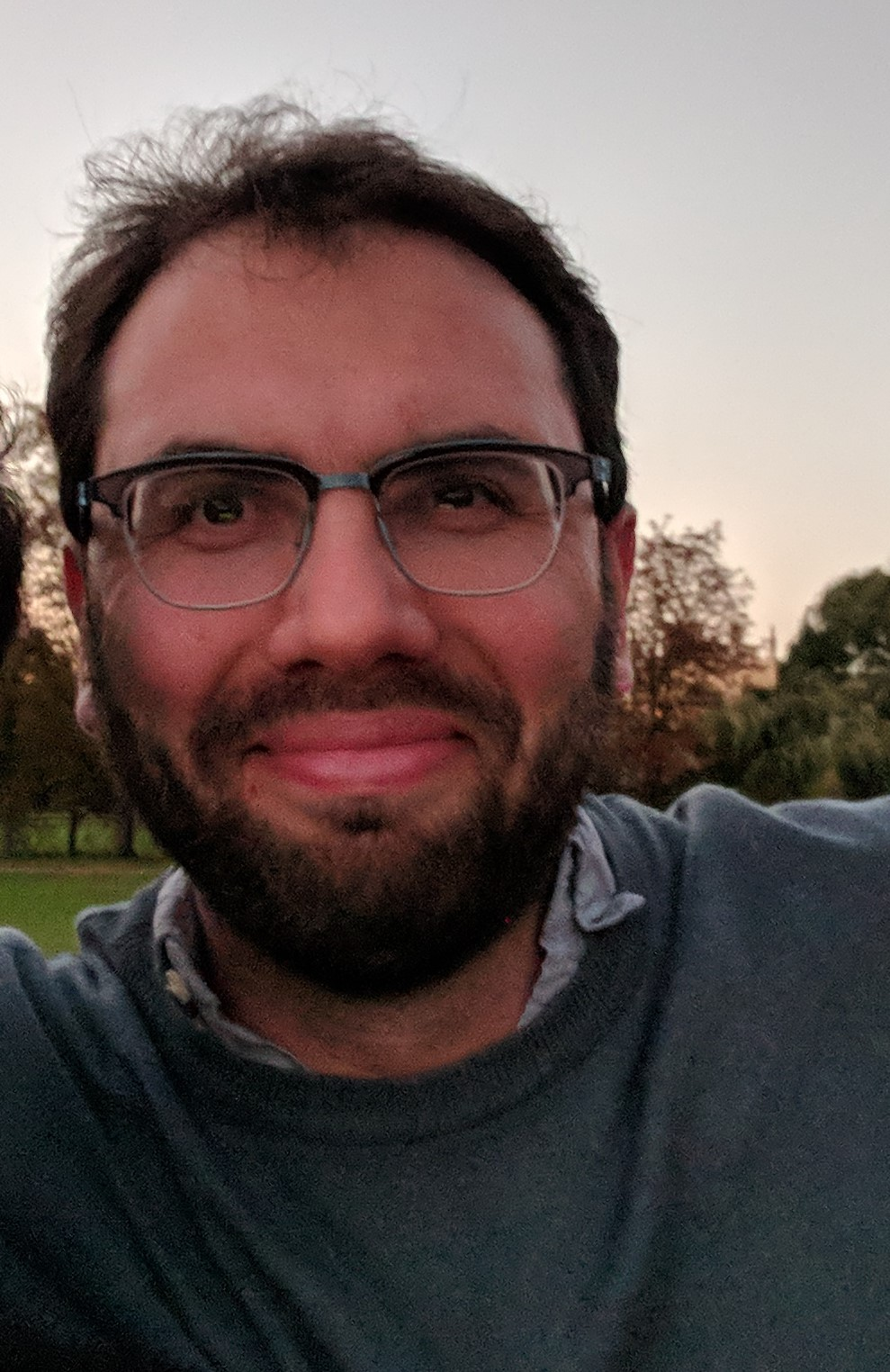
- Schlank in Cambridge, UK in 2018
- Born: 29 July 1982 (age 44); Jerusalem, Israel
- Education: Tel Aviv University; Hebrew University of Jerusalem
- Known for: Telescope conjecture Chromatic Nullstellensatz
- Awards: Alon Fellowship (2015); Erdős Prize (2022); Clay Research Award (2026)
- Scientific career
- Fields: Mathematics
- Workplaces: Hebrew University of Jerusalem; The University of Chicago; Harvard University
- Doctoral advisor: Ehud de Shalit

Tomer Moshe Schlank (Hebrew: תומר משה שלנק; born 1982) is an Israeli mathematician and a professor at Harvard University. Previously, he was a professor at University of Chicago and at the Hebrew University of Jerusalem. He primarily works in homotopy theory, algebraic geometry, and number theory. In 2022 he won the Erdős prize in mathematics and in 2023 he was awarded a European Research Council consolidator grant. He is an editor for the Israel Journal of Mathematics. In 2026 he was awarded the Clay Research Award.

== Biography ==
Schlank was born on July 29, 1982, in Jerusalem, Israel. He graduated with a bachelor's degree from Tel Aviv University in 2001 and a master's degree from Tel Aviv University in 2008. He received his Ph.D. from the Hebrew University of Jerusalem in January 2013, working under the supervision of Ehud de Shalit. His education was also influenced by the close proximity of David Kazhdan and Emmanuel Dror Farjoun. After completing his PhD, Schlank was hired as a Simons postdoctoral fellow at MIT. Afterwards he moved back to the Hebrew University in Jerusalem. Schlank is the great-grandson of the scientist Maria Pogonowska.

== Research ==
Schlank is primarily known for his work on chromatic homotopy theory. Together with Robert Burklund, Jeremy Hahn, and Ishan Levy, he disproved the telescope conjecture for all heights greater than 1 and for all primes. This was the last outstanding conjecture among Ravenel's conjectures. The disproof made use of his work on ambidexterity of the T(n)-local category and cyclotomic extensions of the T(n)-local sphere with Ben-Moshe, Carmeli, and Yanovski. With Barthel, Stapleton, and Weinstein, he calculated the homotopy groups of the rationalization of the K(n)-local sphere. With Burklund and Yuan, Schlank proved the "chromatic nullstellensatz", a version of Hilbert's nullstellensatz for the T(n)-local category in which Morava E-theories play the role of algebraically closed fields. This work resolved the Ausoni—Rognes redshift conjecture for $E_\infty$-ring spectra and also produced $E_\infty$-orientations of Morava E-theory.

Schlank's early work was a synthesis of homotopy theory and number theory. With Harpaz, he developed homotopy obstructions to the existence of rational points on smooth varieties over number fields and related these homotopy obstructions to the Manin obstruction. He wrote his thesis, titled "Applications of homotopy theory to the study of obstructions to existence of rational points", on this topic.

Schlank is known for the breadth of his work and for bringing together seemingly unrelated concepts from different fields to solve problems. In mathematics, he has published papers in algebraic geometry, algebraic topology, category theory, combinatorics, dynamical systems, geometric topology, number theory, and representation theory.
