= Surgery structure set =

In mathematics, the surgery structure set $\mathcal{S} (X)$ is the basic object in the study of manifolds which are homotopy equivalent to a closed manifold X. It is a concept which helps to answer the question whether two homotopy equivalent manifolds are diffeomorphic (or PL-homeomorphic or homeomorphic). There are different versions of the structure set depending on the category (DIFF, PL or TOP) and whether Whitehead torsion is taken into account or not.

== Definition ==
Let X be a closed smooth (or PL- or topological) manifold of dimension n. We call two homotopy equivalences $f_i: M_i \to X$ from closed manifolds $M_i$ of dimension $n$ to $X$ ($i=0,1$) equivalent if there exists a cobordism $\mathcal{}(W;M_0,M_1)$ together with a map $(F;f_0,f_1): (W;M_0,M_1) \to (X \times [0,1];X \times \{0\},X \times \{1\})$ such that $F$, $f_0$ and $f_1$ are homotopy equivalences. The structure set $\mathcal{S}^h (X)$ is the set of equivalence classes of homotopy equivalences $f: M \to X$ from closed manifolds of dimension n to X. This set has a preferred base point: $id: X \to X$.

There is also a version which takes Whitehead torsion into account. If we require in the definition above the homotopy equivalences F, $f_0$ and $f_1$ to be simple homotopy equivalences then we obtain the simple structure set $\mathcal{S}^s (X)$.

== Remarks ==
Notice that $(W;M_0,M_1)$ in the definition of $\mathcal{S}^h (X)$ resp. $\mathcal{S}^s (X)$ is an h-cobordism resp. an s-cobordism. Using the s-cobordism theorem we obtain another description for the simple structure set $\mathcal{S}^s (X)$, provided that n>4: The simple structure set $\mathcal{S}^s (X)$ is the set of equivalence classes of homotopy equivalences $f: M \to X$ from closed manifolds $M$ of dimension n to X with respect to the following equivalence relation. Two homotopy equivalences $f_i: M_i \to X$ (i=0,1) are equivalent if there exists a diffeomorphism (or PL-homeomorphism or homeomorphism) $g: M_0 \to M_1$ such that $f_1 \circ g$ is homotopic to $f_0$.

As long as we are dealing with differential manifolds, there is in general no canonical group structure on $\mathcal{S}^s (X)$. If we deal with topological manifolds, it is possible to endow $\mathcal{S}^s (X)$ with a preferred structure of an abelian group (see chapter 18 in the book of Ranicki).

Notice that a manifold M is diffeomorphic (or PL-homeomorphic or homeomorphic) to a closed manifold X if and only if there exists a simple homotopy equivalence $\phi: M \to X$ whose equivalence class is the base point in $\mathcal{S}^s (X)$. Some care is necessary because it may be possible that a given simple homotopy equivalence $\phi: M \to X$ is not homotopic to a diffeomorphism (or PL-homeomorphism or homeomorphism) although M and X are diffeomorphic (or PL-homeomorphic or homeomorphic). Therefore, it is also necessary to study the operation of the group of homotopy classes of simple self-equivalences of X on $\mathcal{S}^s (X)$.

The basic tool to compute the simple structure set is the surgery exact sequence.

== Examples ==
Topological Spheres: The generalized Poincaré conjecture in the topological category says that $\mathcal{S}^s (S^n)$ only consists of the base point. This conjecture was proved by Smale (n > 4), Freedman (n = 4) and Perelman (n = 3).

Exotic Spheres: The classification of exotic spheres by Kervaire and Milnor gives $\mathcal{S}^s (S^n) = \theta_n = \pi_n(PL/O)$ for n > 4 (smooth category).
