= Michel Lazard =

French mathematician (1924–1987)

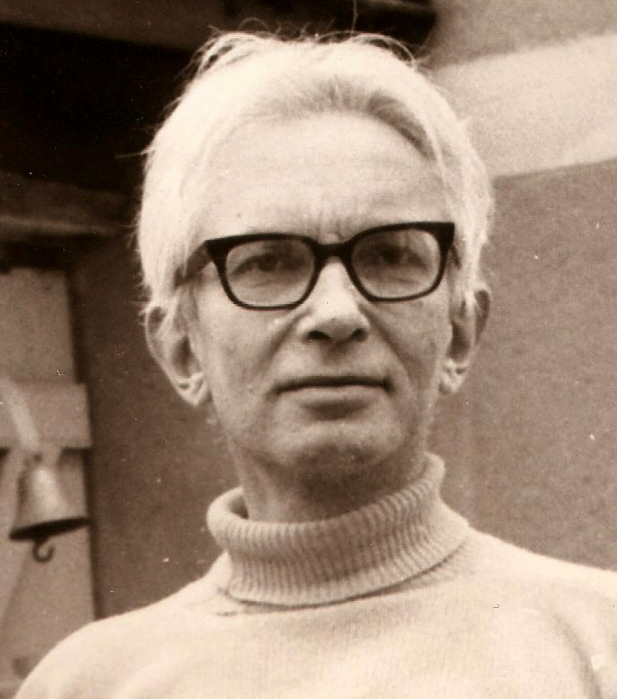

Michel Paul Lazard (5 December 1924 – 15 September 1987) was a French mathematician who worked on the theory of Lie groups in the context of p-adic analysis.

== Career and research ==
Born in Paris, Lazard studied at the University of Paris–Sorbonne, where he obtained his Ph.D. in 1954 under the direction of Albert Châtelet, with thesis titled Sur les groupes nilpotents et les anneaux de Lie. Subsequently he was a professor at the University of Poitiers and the University of Paris 7. He died of suicide at the age of 63.

His work took on a life of its own in the hands of Daniel Quillen in the late 20th century. Quillen's discovery, that a ring Lazard used to classify formal group laws was isomorphic to an important ring in topology, led to the subject of chromatic homotopy theory. Lazard's self-contained treatise on one-dimensional formal groups also gave rise to the field of p-divisible groups. His major contributions were:

- The classification of p-adic Lie groups: every p-adic Lie group is a closed subgroup of ${\rm GL}_n(\mathbb{Z}_p)$.
- The classification of (1-dimensional commutative) formal groups.
- The universal formal group law coefficient ring (Lazard's universal ring) is a polynomial ring.
- The concept of "analyseurs", reinvented by J. Peter May under the name operads.

== Awards and honours ==
In 1958, Lazard was the first recipient of the Prix Audin, named after the young French mathematician Maurice Audin, who had been assassinated in Algeria. In 1972, he was awarded the Prix Poncelet by the Académie des Sciences for his work on algebra.
