= Ravenel's conjectures =

Set of mathematical conjectures proposed by Douglas Ravenel

In mathematics, the Ravenel conjectures are a set of mathematical conjectures in the field of stable homotopy theory posed by Douglas Ravenel at the end of a paper published in 1984. It was earlier circulated in preprint. The problems involved have largely been resolved, with all but the "telescope conjecture" being proved in later papers by others. Ravenel's conjectures exerted influence on the field through the founding of the approach of chromatic homotopy theory.

The first of the seven conjectures, then the nilpotence conjecture, was proved in 1988 and is now known as the nilpotence theorem.

The telescope conjecture, which was fourth on the original list, remains of substantial interest because of its connection with the convergence of an Adams–Novikov spectral sequence. While opinion has been generally against the truth of the original statement, investigations of associated phenomena (for a triangulated category in general) have become a research area in its own right.

On June 6, 2023, Robert Burklund, Jeremy Hahn, Ishan Levy, and Tomer Schlank announced a disproof of the telescope conjecture. Their preprint was submitted to the arXiv on October 26, 2023.

== See also ==
- Homotopy groups of spheres
