= Virginia Young =

Virginia Young may refer to:

- Virginia S. Young (1917–1994), American politician
- Virginia R. Young, American mathematician
- Virginia Young (weight thrower), winner of the 1990 USA Indoor Track and Field Championships
- Virginia Young (heptathlete), Australian heptathlete
