= Goro Nishida =

Japanese mathematician

Goro Nishida (西田 吾郎, Nishida Gorō; 18 September 1943, in Osaka – 2 June 2014) was a Japanese mathematician. He was a leading member of the Japanese school of homotopy theory, following in the tradition of Hiroshi Toda.

Nishida received his Ph.D. from Kyoto University in 1973, after spending the 1971–72 academic year at the University of Manchester in England. He then became a professor at Kyoto University in 1990. His proof in 1973 of Michael Barratt's conjecture (that positive-degree elements in the stable homotopy ring of spheres are nilpotent) was a major breakthrough: following Frank Adams' solution of the Hopf invariant one problem, it marked the beginning of a new global understanding of algebraic topology.

His contributions to the field were celebrated in 2003 at the NishidaFest in Kinosaki, followed by a satellite conference at the Nagoya Institute of Technology; the proceedings were published in Geometry and Topology's monograph series. In 2000 he was the leading organizer for a concentration year at the Japan–US Mathematics Institute at Johns Hopkins University.

Nishida's earliest work grew out of the study of infinite loop spaces; his first paper (in 1968, on what came eventually to be known as the Nishida relations) accounts for interactions between Steenrod operations and Kudo–Araki (Dyer–Lashof) operations. Some of his later work concerns a circle of ideas surrounding the Segal conjecture, transfer homomorphisms, and stable splittings of classifying spaces of groups. The ideas in this series of papers have by now grown into a rich subfield of homotopy theory; it continues today in (for example) the theory of p-compact groups.
