= Elliptic cohomology =

Cohomology theory related to elliptic curves

In mathematics, elliptic cohomology is a cohomology theory related to elliptic curves and modular forms.

== Definition ==
Call a cohomology theory $A^*$ even periodic when $A^i = 0$ for $i$ odd and there is an invertible element $u\in A^2$. These theories possess a complex orientation, which gives a formal group law. A particularly rich source for formal group laws are elliptic curves. A cohomology theory $A$ with

$$A^0 = R$$

is called elliptic if it is even periodic and its formal group law is isomorphic to a formal group law of an elliptic curve $E$ over $R$. The usual construction of such elliptic cohomology theories uses the Landweber exact functor theorem. If the formal group law of $E$ is Landweber exact, one can define an elliptic cohomology theory (on finite complexes) by

$$A^*(X) = MU^*(X)\otimes_{MU^*}R[u,u^{-1}]. \,$$

Franke has identified the condition needed to fulfill Landweber exactness:

1. $R$ needs to be flat over $\mathbb{Z}$, and
2. There is no irreducible component $X$ of $\text{Spec }R/pR$, where the fiber $E_x$ is supersingular for every $x\in X$.

These conditions can be checked in many cases related to elliptic genera. Moreover, the conditions are fulfilled in the universal case in the sense that the map from the moduli stack of elliptic curves to the moduli stack of formal groups

$$\mathcal{M}_{1,1}\to\mathcal{M}_{fg}$$

is flat. This gives then a presheaf of cohomology theories

$$\mathcal{O}_{e\ell\ell}^{\mathrm{pre}}: \text{Aff}/(\mathcal{M}_{1,1})_{\mathrm{flat}} \to \textbf{Spectra}$$

over the site of affine schemes flat over the moduli stack of elliptic curves. The desire to get a universal elliptic cohomology theory by taking global sections has led to the construction of the topological modular forms

$$\mathbf{Tmf} = \underset{X \to \mathcal{M}_{1,1}}{\textbf{Holim}}\text{ } \mathcal{O}_{e\ell\ell}^{\mathrm{pre}}(X)$$

as the homotopy limit of this presheaf over the previous site.

== History and motivation ==
Elliptic cohomology arose from the study of elliptic genera. It was known by Atiyah and Hirzebruch that if the unit circle $S^1$ acts smoothly and non-trivially on a spin manifold, then the index of the Dirac operator vanishes. In 1983, Witten conjectured that in this situation the equivariant index of a certain twisted Dirac operator is at least constant. This led to certain other problems concerning $S^1$-actions on manifolds, which Ochanine solved by introducing elliptic genera. In turn, Witten related these to (conjectural) index theory on free loop spaces. Elliptic cohomology, invented in its original form by Landweber, Stong and Ravenel in the late 1980s, was introduced to clarify certain issues with elliptic genera and provide a context for (conjectural) index theory of families of differential operators on free loop spaces. In some sense it can be seen as an approximation to the K-theory of the free loop space.

== See also ==
- Chromatic homotopy theory
- Intermediate Jacobian
- Spectral algebraic geometry
