= Complex-oriented cohomology theory =

In algebraic topology, a complex-orientable cohomology theory is a multiplicative cohomology theory E such that the restriction map $E^2(\mathbb{C}\mathbf{P}^\infty) \to E^2(\mathbb{C}\mathbf{P}^1)$ is surjective. An element of $E^2(\mathbb{C}\mathbf{P}^\infty)$ that restricts to the canonical generator of the reduced theory $\widetilde{E}^2(\mathbb{C}\mathbf{P}^1)$ is called a complex orientation. The notion is central to Quillen's work relating cohomology to formal group laws.

If $E$ is an even-graded theory meaning $\pi_3 E = \pi_5 E = \cdots=0$, then $E$ is complex-orientable. This follows from the Atiyah–Hirzebruch spectral sequence.

Examples:

- An ordinary cohomology with any coefficient ring R is complex orientable, as $\operatorname{H}^2(\mathbb{C}\mathbf{P}^\infty; R) \simeq \operatorname{H}^2(\mathbb{C}\mathbf{P}^1;R)$.
- Complex K-theory, denoted KU, is complex-orientable, as it is even-graded. (Bott periodicity theorem)
- Complex cobordism, whose spectrum is denoted by MU, is complex-orientable.

A complex orientation, call it t, gives rise to a formal group law as follows: let m be the multiplication

$$\mathbb{C}\mathbf{P}^\infty \times \mathbb{C}\mathbf{P}^\infty \to \mathbb{C}\mathbf{P}^\infty, ([x], [y]) \mapsto [xy]$$

where $[x]$ denotes a line passing through x in the underlying vector space $\mathbb{C}[t]$ of $\mathbb{C}\mathbf{P}^\infty$. This is the map classifying the tensor product of the universal line bundle over $\mathbb{C}\mathbf{P}^\infty$. Viewing

$$E^*(\mathbb{C}\mathbf{P}^\infty) = \varprojlim E^*(\mathbb{C}\mathbf{P}^n) = \varprojlim R[t]/(t^{n+1}) = R[\![t]\!], \quad R =\pi_* E$$,

let $f = m^*(t)$ be the pullback of t along m. It lives in

$$E^*(\mathbb{C}\mathbf{P}^\infty \times \mathbb{C}\mathbf{P}^\infty) = \varprojlim E^*(\mathbb{C}\mathbf{P}^n \times \mathbb{C}\mathbf{P}^m) = \varprojlim R[x,y]/(x^{n+1},y^{m+1}) = R[\![x, y]\!]$$

and one can show, using properties of the tensor product of line bundles, it is a formal group law (e.g., satisfies associativity).

== See also ==
- Chromatic homotopy theory
