= Maria Pogonowska =

Polish-Israeli scientist

- מריה פוגונובסקה
- Born: Maria Asterblum; 30 October 1897; Warsaw
- Died: 15 July 2009 (aged 111); Tel Aviv
- Other name: Maria Proner
- Education: University of Warsaw
- Occupations: doctor of physics, pedagogist
- Employer: University of Warsaw Medical Academy of Warsaw House for Chronically Ill Children in Warsaw
- Spouse: Mieczysław Proner
- Children: 1

Maria Pogonowska (Hebrew: מריה פוגונובסקה; 30 October 1897 – 15 July 2009) was a Polish-Israeli scientist of Jewish origin. She was a doctor of physics.

== Biography ==
Maria Asterblum was born in Warsaw. Her father was Maurycy, a lawyer and her mother Salomea. In 1915, she entered Warsaw University, which had newly opened after the Russians left Warsaw, to study physics. She was one of only four women admitted in the first year of studies. In 1924, she became the first doctor promoted by the Department of Physics; her doctoral advisor was Stefan Pieńkowski. She worked as a senior assistant at the Department of Experimental Physics at Warsaw University and has written several papers in the field of optical tests.

On 3 July 1927, she married Mieczysław Proner, doctor of pharmacy and Warsaw University lecturer. On 14 January 1929, their only daughter Janina was born. They continued their work at the Warsaw University until 1938. When World War II broke out, Mieczysław Proner was mobilized to the army and captured by the Soviets. In the spring of 1940, he was murdered in Kharkov.

After the establishment of the Warsaw Ghetto, Maria, at the urging of friends, remained with her daughter on the Aryan side. She received documents in the name Pogonowska, which she used for the rest of her life. She repeatedly changed her residence and made her living by trading in foodstuffs, cigarettes and soap. Her older sister and parents were sent to the Warsaw Ghetto, as well as the family of her husband. Pogonowska and her daughter were in the district of Ochota during the Warsaw Uprising. They were cast out of their apartment to the labor camp in Bunzlau (Bolesławiec), which the Soviet Army liberated in February 1945. At the time, they were unaware of Mieczysław Proner's death, who was omitted in the lists of the victims of Katyń massacre, disclosed by the Germans in 1943.

After the war, Pogonowska decided not to return to her scientific career, instead working for the House for Chronically Ill Children in Warsaw. She also contributed to the land acquisition for the orphanages house, and was active in its planning, construction and furnishing. She worked there until her retirement in 1962. During this time, she was unable to determine the fate of her husband. During retirement she remained active, taking care of her grandchildren and teaching classes at the Medical Academy of Warsaw.

In 1968 Pogonowska accompanied her daughter Janina and her family to Israel. Janina later became Professor of medical Microbiology at the Tel Aviv Medical University. Maria cared for her grandchildren and later great-grandchildren and, for a time, worked a job renting out rented Polish books. She went through a formal explanation of the circumstances of her husband's death in 1990 and in 1994 participated in a ceremony that planted thousands of trees near Jerusalem to symbolize the Katyń Woods. A piece written by her between 1995 and 2000 called Memoirs Warszawianka appeared on the pages of the Quarterly Jewish History in 2009. In 1980, at her request, Maria Palester was honored with the Righteous Among the Nations title. One of Pogonowska's great-grandchildren through Janina is mathematician Tomer Schlank.

On her 110th birthday, Pogonowska received congratulations from the presidents of Poland and Israel and from Irena Sendler. She died in Tel Aviv, Israel, on 15 July 2009, aged 111 years 258 days.

== Bibliography ==
- Jan Bohdan Gliński, Słownik biograficzny lekarzy i farmaceutów ofiar drugiej wojny światowej, tom I, Wydawnictwo Medyczne Urban & Partner, Wrocław 1997, p. 338–339 (mostly on Mieczysław Proner).
- Janina Goldhar, Maria Proner-Pogonowska z domu Asterblum. Od XIX do XXI wieku, w: Pisane miłością. Losy wdów katyńskich, tom III (ed. Andrzej Spanily), Gdyńska Oficyna Wydawnicza "ASP Rymsza", Gdynia 2003, p. 387–395.
- Maria Proner-Pogonowska, Wspomnienia warszawianki, w: "Kwartalnik Historii Żydów", 2009, nr 1 (229), p. 45–80.
- Jadwiga Rytlowa, Wspomnienie (1897–2009). Dr Maria Proner-Pogonowska, w: "Gazeta Wyborcza", 24 sierpnia 2009.
- Anna Maria Wolińska, Maria Pogonowska – świadek wieku, in: "Kombatant. Biuletyn Urzędu do spraw Kombatantów i Osób Represjonowanych", 2008, nr 4 (207), p. 24–25.
