= Virginia R. Young =

American mathematician

Virginia Ruth Young
- Education: University of Virginia (Ph.D.); Cumberland College
- Scientific career
- Fields: Mathematics (Actuary)
- Workplaces: University of Michigan (2003–); University of Wisconsin–Madison (1993–2003); Cumberland College (1986–1990)
- Thesis: Branched Coverings Arising from Group Actions (1984)
- Doctoral advisor: Robert Evert Stong

Virginia Ruth Young is an American mathematician and actuary. She is the Cecil J. and Ethel M. Nesbitt Professor of Actuarial Mathematics at the University of Michigan, and an expert on the mathematics of insurance.

== Education and career ==
Young graduated from Cumberland College in 1981, and completed a PhD in mathematics, specializing in algebraic topology, at the University of Virginia in 1984. Her dissertation, Branched coverings arising from group actions, was supervised by Robert Evert Stong. After postdoctoral research at the Institute for Advanced Study, she returned to Cumberland as a faculty member from 1986 to 1990. However, after earning tenure at Cumberland, she left academia and began working as an actuary, becoming a Fellow of the Society of Actuaries in 1992. She rejoined academia as an assistant professor of business at the University of Wisconsin–Madison in 1993, and moved to Michigan as the inaugural Nesbitt Professor in 2003.

== Contributions ==
Young won the 1997 Halmstad Prize and 1998 Edward A. Lew Award of the Society of Actuaries for her work with Frees, King, Rosenberg, and Lai on mathematical models for the long-term behavior of the US Social Security system. Other topics in her research have included comparisons of least squares versus entropy-based methods for actuarial prediction, and the applications of stochastic control to portfolio optimization problems involving insurance policies.
