= Ehud de Shalit =

Israeli mathematician (born 1955)

- אהוד דה שליט
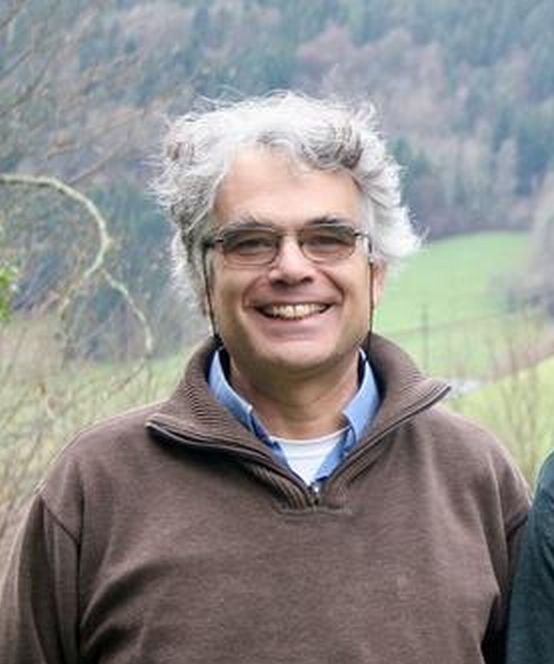
- Born: March 16, 1955 (age 71); Rehovot, Israel
- Education: Hebrew University; Princeton University
- Awards: Alon Fellowship (1987)
- Scientific career
- Fields: Number theory
- Thesis: On $p$-adic $L$-functions Associated with CM Elliptic Curves, and Arithmetical Applications (1984)
- Doctoral advisor: Andrew Wiles
- Doctoral students: Tomer Schlank

Ehud de Shalit (Hebrew: אהוד דה שליט; born 16 March 1955) is an Israeli number theorist and professor at the Hebrew University of Jerusalem.

== Biography ==
Ehud de Shalit was born in Rehovot. His father was Amos de-Shalit. He completed his B.Sc. at the Hebrew University in 1975, and his Ph.D. at Princeton University in 1984 under the supervision of Andrew Wiles.

== Academic career ==
De Shalit joined the faculty of Hebrew University in 1987 and was promoted to full professor in 2001. He is an editor for the Israel Journal of Mathematics.

== Published works ==
- De Shalit, Ehud (2001). "Residues on buildings and de Rham cohomology of $p$-adic symmetric domains". Duke Mathematical Journal. 106 (1): 123–191. doi:10.1215/s0012-7094-01-10615-7.
- De Shalit, Ehud (1989). "Eichler cohomology and periods of modular forms on $p$-adic Schottky groups". Journal für die reine und angewandte Mathematik. 1989 (400): 3–31. doi:10.1515/crll.1989.400.3. S2CID 118777849.
- Coleman, Robert; de Shalit, Ehud (1988). "$p$-adic regulators on curves and special values of $p$-adic $L$-functions". Inventiones Mathematicae. 93 (2): 239–266. Bibcode:1988InMat..93..239C. doi:10.1007/bf01394332. S2CID 122242212.
- De Shalit, Ehud (1987). Iwasawa theory of elliptic curves with complex multiplication. Perspectives in Mathematics. Boston: Academic Press. ISBN 978-0-12-210255-4. OCLC 256787655.
- De Shalit, Ehud (1985). "Relative Lubin-Tate Groups" (PDF). Proceedings of the American Mathematical Society. 95 (1): 1–4. doi:10.2307/2045561. JSTOR 2045561.
