= Redshift conjecture =

In mathematics, more specifically in chromatic homotopy theory, the redshift conjecture states, roughly, that algebraic K-theory $K(R)$ has chromatic level one higher than that of a complex-oriented ring spectrum R. It was formulated by John Rognes in a lecture at Schloss Ringberg, Germany, in January 1999, and made more precise by him in a lecture at the Oberwolfach Research Institute for Mathematics, Germany, in September 2000. In July 2022, Robert Burklund, Tomer Schlank and Allen Yuan announced a solution of a version of the redshift conjecture for arbitrary $E_{\infty}$-ring spectra, after Hahn and Wilson did so earlier in the case of the truncated Brown-Peterson spectra $BP\langle{n}\rangle$.
