= Chromatic spectral sequence =

Homotypic spectrum

In mathematics, the chromatic spectral sequence is a spectral sequence, introduced by Ravenel (1978), used for calculating the initial term of the Adams spectral sequence for Brown–Peterson cohomology, which is in turn used for calculating the stable homotopy groups of spheres.

== See also ==
- Chromatic homotopy theory
- Adams-Novikov spectral sequence
- p-local spectrum
