= Adams filtration =

In mathematics, especially in the area of algebraic topology known as stable homotopy theory, the Adams filtration and the Adams–Novikov filtration allow a stable homotopy group to be understood as built from layers, the nth layer containing just those maps which require at most n auxiliary spaces in order to be a composition of homologically trivial maps. These filtrations, named after Frank Adams and Sergei Novikov, are of particular interest because the Adams (–Novikov) spectral sequence converges to them.

== Definition ==
The group of stable homotopy classes $[X,Y]$ between two spectra X and Y can be given a filtration by saying that a map $f\colon X\to Y$ has filtration n if it can be written as a composite of maps

$$X=X_0 \to  X_1 \to \cdots \to X_n = Y$$

such that each individual map $X_i\to X_{i+1}$ induces the zero map in some fixed homology theory E. If E is ordinary mod-p homology, this filtration is called the Adams filtration, otherwise the Adams–Novikov filtration.
