= Nelson Saiers =

American artist and former hedge fund manager

- Born: 1974 or 1975 (age 50–51); Denver, Colorado
- Known for: Mathematics-based art
- Notable work: Shortening: Making the Irrational Rational
- Movement: Contemporary Art
- Scientific career
- Education: University of Virginia
- Fields: Mathematics
- Thesis: Involutions Fixing Products of Projective Spaces (1998)
- Doctoral advisors: Robert Evert Stong
- Website: nelsonsaiers.com

Nelson Saiers is an American mathematical artist and former hedge fund manager. Before 2014, he worked in finance as a Managing Director at Deutsche Bank AG and as the chief investment officer at Saiers Capital, LLC (formerly Alphabet Management, LLC). In 2014, Saiers left finance to create mathematics-based art.

== Early life and education ==
Nelson Saiers was born in Denver, Colorado. He spent the first five years of his life in Ethiopia and Afghanistan while his father worked for the United States Agency for International Development. At the age of one, Saiers was held at gunpoint in Ethiopia while passing through a security checkpoint in the aftermath of the overthrow of Haile Selassie. Saiers lived in Afghanistan during the Saur Revolution. Saiers' family relocated to Swaziland and Ghana before eventually moving to Virginia.

In 1997, Saiers graduated from the University of Virginia. In 1998, he received a Ph.D. in mathematics from the University of Virginia at the age of 23. His thesis, Involutions Fixing Products of Projective Spaces, was in algebraic topology and was advised by Robert Evert Stong.

== Financial career ==
Saiers began his trading career at Susquehanna International Group. He also later worked at UBS and Deutsche Bank. At Deutsche Bank, Nelson was a Managing Director and ran a proprietary trading business focused on derivatives.

In July 2010, Saiers left Deutsche Bank to join Alphabet Management, a New York hedge fund specializing in derivatives. He was promoted to chief investment officer in March 2011. Saiers' younger brother Scott also joined Alphabet in February 2012 as Head Trader.

In December 2012, Alphabet announced that the firm would change its name to Saiers Capital, LLC. Barron's described Saiers as having been a "star quant".

== Art career ==
In 2014, Saiers left finance to create mathematics-based art.

Saiers' art has been featured in solo shows at Harvard University's Leverett House, Alcatraz Federal Penitentiary, and multiple New York City galleries. Saiers also installed a 9-foot inflatable rat covered with bitcoin references and code in front of the Federal Reserve as a homage to Satoshi Nakamoto and protests in New York City. In late 2021 Saiers commented on the Federal Reserve's "cheap money" monetary policy by installing a sculpture next to the Wall Street Charging Bull. It consisted of a gumball machine that was filled with $10 bills offered for 25 cents with an "Out of Order!" sign on its face.

=== Alcatraz ===
From July 2016 to February 2017, Saiers exhibited a large scale installation at Alcatraz titled "Shortening: Making the Irrational Rational". Combining properties of pi, prison vernacular, and literary references, the work addressed the "irrationally" long prison sentences that are given for minor, nonviolent drug violations. The exhibit featured the first several hundred digits of pi on football jerseys. Saiers explained, "In prison, long sentences are often referred to as 'football numbers' because the duration in years resembles numbers on a football jersey." Saiers told KQED about the exhibit, "Pi is what's called an irrational number, which means it never ends nor repeats [...] Now the way to turn it into a rational number is to shorten it. So that's a very good metaphor for what needs to be done to these irrational prison sentences" to make them rational.

The exhibit's jerseys hanging on a hemp clothesline also made reference to the phrase "hung out to dry" and the abandonment of inmates.

=== Wall Street ===
Saiers' "Inside Wall Street" series of paintings exhibited at Hoerle-Guggenheim Gallery, in 2016 was focused on financial crises and incorporated financial algorithms that his hedge fund team had previously written. Saiers' large scale sculpture, called "Arbitrage" placed a black graffitied Volkswagen Beetle in Chelsea, Manhattan in reference to the 2008 Volkswagen short squeeze leading to it briefly becoming the largest company in the world by market value.

== Philanthropy ==
In October 2013, during the graffiti artist Banksy's month-long New York project "Better Out Than In", Saiers made a public offer to donate $100,000 to the Hurricane Sandy rebuilding effort if Banksy created a legal mural in New York to raise awareness for people still affected by the storm. After not hearing back from Banksy, Saiers decided to go forward with the $100,000 donation regardless of whether the mural would be created. In addition to his personal contribution, he raised another $142,000 from anonymous donors contingent on the creation of the mural.

Nelson is affiliated with charity: water, which attempts to provide clean water to those in developing countries. Nelson is a Founding Member of The Well, a core group of donors who support charity: water.
