= Lazard's universal ring =

In mathematics, Lazard's universal ring is a ring introduced by Michel Lazard in Lazard (1955) over which the universal commutative one-dimensional formal group law is defined.

There is a universal commutative one-dimensional formal group law over a universal commutative ring defined as follows. We let

$$F(x,y)$$

be

$$x+y+\sum_{i,j} c_{i,j} x^i y^j$$

for indeterminates $c_{i,j}$, and we define the universal ring R to be the commutative ring generated by the elements $c_{i,j}$, with the relations that are forced by the associativity and commutativity laws for formal group laws. More or less by definition, the ring R has the following universal property:

For every commutative ring S, one-dimensional formal group laws over S correspond to ring homomorphisms from R to S.

The commutative ring R constructed above is known as Lazard's universal ring. At first sight it seems to be incredibly complicated: the relations between its generators are very messy. However Lazard proved that it has a very simple structure: it is just a polynomial ring (over the integers) on generators of degree 1, 2, 3, ..., where $c_{i,j}$ has degree $(i+j-1)$. Daniel Quillen (1969) proved that the coefficient ring of complex cobordism is naturally isomorphic as a graded ring to Lazard's universal ring. Hence, topologists commonly regrade the Lazard ring so that $c_{i,j}$ has degree $2(i+j-1)$, because the coefficient ring of complex cobordism is evenly graded.
