= Cobordism hypothesis =

Classification of topological quantum field theories

In mathematics, the cobordism hypothesis, due to John C. Baez and James Dolan, concerns the classification of extended topological quantum field theories (TQFTs). In 2008, Jacob Lurie outlined a proof of the cobordism hypothesis, though the details of his approach have yet to appear in the literature as of 2022. In 2021, Daniel Grady and Dmitri Pavlov claimed a complete proof of the cobordism hypothesis, as well as a generalization to bordisms with arbitrary geometric structures.

== Formulation ==
For a symmetric monoidal $(\infty, n)$-category $\mathcal {C}$ which is fully dualizable and every $k$-morphism of which is adjointable, for $1\leq k\leq n-1$, there is a bijection between the $\mathcal {C}$-valued symmetric monoidal functors of the cobordism category and the objects of $\mathcal {C}$.

== Motivation ==
Symmetric monoidal functors from the cobordism category correspond to topological quantum field theories. The cobordism hypothesis for topological quantum field theories is the analogue of the Eilenberg–Steenrod axioms for homology theories. The Eilenberg–Steenrod axioms state that a homology theory is uniquely determined by its value for the point, so analogously what the cobordism hypothesis states is that a topological quantum field theory is uniquely determined by its value for the point. In other words, the bijection between $\mathcal {C}$-valued symmetric monoidal functors and the objects of $\mathcal {C}$ is uniquely defined by its value for the point.

== See also ==
- Cobordism
