= Johnson–Wilson theory =

Generalized cohomology theory

In algebraic topology, Johnson–Wilson theory E(n) is a generalized cohomology theory introduced by David Copeland Johnson and W. Stephen Wilson (1975). Real Johnson–Wilson theory ER(n) was introduced by Po Hu and Igor Kříž (2001).
