= P-compact group =

Concept in algebraic topology

In mathematics, in particular algebraic topology, a p-compact group is a homotopical version of a compact Lie group, but with all the local structure concentrated at a single prime p. This concept was introduced in Dwyer & Wilkerson (1994), making precise earlier notions of a mod p finite loop space. A p-compact group has many Lie-like properties like maximal tori and Weyl groups, which are defined purely homotopically in terms of the classifying space, but with the important difference that the Weyl group, rather than being a finite reflection group over the integers, is now a finite p-adic reflection group. They admit a classification in terms of root data, which mirrors the classification of compact Lie groups, but with the integers replaced by the p-adic integers.

== Definition ==
A p-compact group is a pointed space BG, which is local with respect to mod p homology, and such the pointed loop space G = ΩBG has finite mod p homology. One sometimes also refer to the p-compact group by G, but then one needs to keep in mind that the loop space structure is part of the data (which then allows one to recover BG).

A p-compact group is said to be connected if G is a connected space (in general the group of components of G will be a finite p-group). The rank of a p-compact group is the rank of its maximal torus.

== Examples ==
- The p-completion, in the sense of homotopy theory, of (the classifying space of) a compact connected Lie group defines a connected p-compact group. (The Weyl group is just its ordinary Weyl group, now viewed as a p-adic reflection group by tensoring the coweight lattice by $\mathbb{Z}_p$.)
- More generally the p-completion of a connected finite loop space defines a p-compact group. (Here the Weyl will be a $\mathbb{Z}_p$-reflection group that may not come from a $\mathbb{Z}$-reflection group.)
- A rank 1 connected 2-compact group is either the 2-completion of SU(2) or SO(3). A rank 1 connected p-compact group, for p odd, is a "Sullivan sphere", i.e., the p-completion of a 2n-1-sphere S^{2n-1}, where n divides p − 1. These spheres turn out to have a unique loop space structure. They were first constructed by Dennis Sullivan in his 1970 MIT notes. (The Weyl group is a cyclic group of order n, acting on $\mathbb{Z}_p$ via an nth root of unity.)
- Generalizing the rank 1 case, any finite complex reflection group $W \le GL_r(\mathbb{C})$ can be realized as the Weyl group of a p-compact group for infinitely many primes, with the primes being determined by whether W and be conjugated into $GL_r(\mathbb{Z}_p)$ or not, with some embedding of $\mathbb{Z}_p$ in $\mathbb{C}$. The construction of a p-compact group with this Weyl group is then relatively straightforward for large primes where p does not divide the order of W (carried out already in Clark & Ewing (1974) using the Chevalley–Shephard–Todd theorem), but requires more sophisticated methods for the "modular primes" p that divide the order of W.

== Classification ==
The classification of p-compact groups from Andersen & Grodal (2009) states that there is a 1-1 correspondence between connected p-compact groups, up to homotopy equivalence, and root data over the p-adic integers, up to isomorphism. This is analogous to the classical classification of connected compact Lie groups, with the p-adic integers replacing the rational integers.

It follows from the classification that any p-compact group can be written as BG = BH × BK where BH is the p-completion of a compact connected Lie group and BK is finite direct product of simple exotic p-compact groups i.e., simple p-compact groups whose Weyl group is not a $\mathbb{Z}$-reflection groups. Simple exotic p-compact groups are again in 1-1-correspondence with irreducible complex reflection groups whose character field can be embedded in $\mathbb{Q}_p$, but is not $\mathbb{Q}$.

For instance, when p=2 this implies that every connected 2-compact group can be written BG = BH × BDI(4)^{s}, where BH is the 2-completion of the classifying space of a connected compact Lie group, and BDI(4)^{s} denotes s copies of the "Dwyer-Wilkerson 2-compact group" BDI(4) of rank 3, constructed in Dwyer & Wilkerson (1993) with Weyl group corresponding to group number 24 in the Shepard-Todd enumeration of complex reflection groups. For p=3 a similar statement holds but the new exotic 3-compact group is now group number 12 on the Shepard-Todd list, of rank 2. For primes greater than 3, family 2 on the Shepard-Todd list will contain infinitely many exotic p-compact groups.

== Some consequences of the classification ==
A finite loop space is a pointed space BG such that the loop space ΩBG is homotopy equivalent to a finite CW-complex. The classification of connected p-compact groups implies a classification of connected finite loop spaces: Given a connected p-compact group for each prime, all with the same rational type, there is an explicit double coset space of possible connected finite loop spaces with p-completion the give p-compact groups. As connected p-compact groups are classified combinatorially, this implies a classification of connected loop spaces as well.

Using the classification, one can identify the compact Lie groups inside finite loop spaces, giving a homotopical characterisation of compact connected Lie groups: They are exactly those finite loop spaces that admit an integral maximal torus; this was the so-called maximal torus conjecture. (See Andersen & Grodal (2009) and Grodal (2010).)

The classification also implies a classification of which graded polynomial rings can occur as the cohomology ring of a space, the so-called Steenrod problem. (See Andersen & Grodal (2008).)
