= Douglas Ravenel =

American mathematician (born 1947)

Douglas C. Ravenel
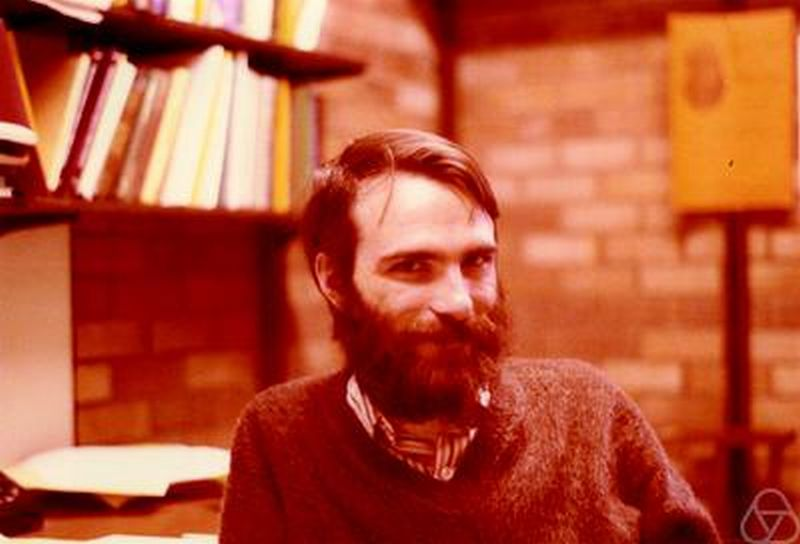
- Ravenel in 1978
- Born: February 17, 1947 (age 79)
- Education: Brandeis University
- Known for: Ravenel conjectures Work on Adams–Novikov spectral sequence
- Awards: Veblen Prize (2022)
- Scientific career
- Fields: Mathematics
- Workplaces: Columbia University; University of Washington; University of Rochester
- Thesis: A definition of exotic characteristic classes (1972)
- Doctoral advisor: Edgar H. Brown, Jr.

Douglas Conner Ravenel (born February 17, 1947) is an American mathematician known for work in algebraic topology.

== Life ==
Ravenel received his PhD from Brandeis University in 1972 under the direction of Edgar H. Brown, Jr. with a thesis on exotic characteristic classes of spherical fibrations. From 1971 to 1973 he was a C. L. E. Moore instructor at the Massachusetts Institute of Technology, and in 1974/75 he visited the Institute for Advanced Study. He became an assistant professor at Columbia University in 1973 and at the University of Washington in Seattle in 1976, where he was promoted to associate professor in 1978 and professor in 1981. From 1977 to 1979 he was a Sloan Fellow. Since 1988 he has been a professor at the University of Rochester. He was an invited speaker at the International Congress of Mathematicians in Helsinki, 1978, and is an editor of The New York Journal of Mathematics since 1994.

In 2012 he became a fellow of the American Mathematical Society. In 2022 he received the Oswald Veblen Prize in Geometry.

== Work ==
Ravenel's main area of work is stable homotopy theory. Two of his most famous papers are Periodic phenomena in the Adams–Novikov spectral sequence, which he wrote together with Haynes R. Miller and W. Stephen Wilson (Annals of Mathematics 106 (1977), 469–516) and Localization with respect to certain periodic homology theories (American Journal of Mathematics 106 (1984), 351–414).

In the first of these two papers, the authors explore the stable homotopy groups of spheres by analyzing the $E^2$-term of the Adams–Novikov spectral sequence. The authors set up the so-called chromatic spectral sequence relating this $E^2$-term to the cohomology of the Morava stabilizer group, which exhibits certain periodic phenomena in the Adams–Novikov spectral sequence and can be seen as the beginning of chromatic homotopy theory. Applying this, the authors compute the second line of the Adams–Novikov spectral sequence and establish the non-triviality of a certain family in the stable homotopy groups of spheres. In all of this, the authors use work by Jack Morava and themselves on Brown–Peterson cohomology and Morava K-theory.

In the second paper, Ravenel expands these phenomena to a global picture of stable homotopy theory leading to the Ravenel conjectures. In this picture, complex cobordism and Morava K-theory control many qualitative phenomena, which were understood before only in special cases. Here Ravenel uses localization in the sense of Aldridge K. Bousfield in a crucial way. All but one of the Ravenel conjectures were proved by Ethan Devinatz, Michael J. Hopkins and Jeff Smith not long after the article got published. Frank Adams said on that occasion:

At one time it seemed as if homotopy theory was utterly without system; now it is almost proved that systematic effects predominate.

In June 2023, Robert Burklund, Jeremy Hahn, Ishan Levy, and Tomer Schlank announced a disproof of the last remaining conjecture.

In further work, Ravenel calculates the Morava K-theories of several spaces and proves important theorems in chromatic homotopy theory together with Hopkins. He was also one of the founders of elliptic cohomology. In 2009, he solved together with Michael Hill and Michael Hopkins the Kervaire invariant problem for large dimensions.

Ravenel has written three books: the first on the computation of the stable homotopy groups of spheres; the second on the Ravenel conjectures—colloquially known among topologists as the ‘green’ and ‘orange’ books, respectively (though the former is now burgundy in its current edition); and the third, coauthored with Hill and Hopkins, on the resolution of the Kervaire invariant problem.

== Selected works ==
- Complex cobordism and the stable homotopy groups of spheres, Academic Press 1986, 2nd edition, AMS 2003, online:
- Nilpotency and periodicity in stable homotopy theory, Princeton, Annals of Mathematics Studies 1992
