= Louis Landweber =

American hydrodynamist (1912 – 1998)

Louis Landweber (8 January 1912, New York City – 19 January 1998, Iowa City, Iowa), was a leading ship hydrodynamicist, known for Landweber iteration.

== Education and career ==
Landweber received in 1932 a bachelor's degree in mathematics from the City College of New York. After graduation, he became a physicist at the United States Experimental Model Basin at the Washington Navy Yard. He received a master's degree in physics from George Washington University. Starting in 1940, he led a research group for mine-sweeping and other war-related activities. He received a Ph.D. in physics from the University of Maryland and was promoted to the head of the hydrodynamics division of the David Taylor Model Basin in Carderock, Maryland, before leaving for a professorship at the University of Iowa. There he was a research engineer at the Iowa Institute of Hydraulic Research as well as a professor of mechanics and hydraulics at the University of Iowa, where he remained until his retirement in 1982.

... Landweber supervised more than 50 masters and doctoral students and served as author, co-author or editor of approximately 150 technical papers, reports, monographs and books in the fields of hydrodynamics and naval architecture.

He was married and had two sons, including mathematician Peter Landweber.

== Awards and honors ==
- 1947 — U. S. Navy's Distinguished Meritorious Civilian Service Award
- 1978 — David W. Taylor Lecturer at the David W. Taylor Naval Ship Research and Development Center
- 1978 — Davidson Medal from the Society of Naval Architects and Marine Engineers
- 1979 — special conference organized in his honor, the Third Engineering Mechanics Division Specialty Conference of the American Society of Civil Engineers
- 1980 — election to the National Academy of Engineers
- 1993 — Sixth International Conference on Numerical Ship Hydrodynamics held in his honor in Iowa City
