= Robert Evert Stong =

American mathematician (1936–2008)

Robert Evert Stong (August 23, 1936, Oklahoma City – April 10, 2008, Charlottesville, Virginia) was a mathematician at the University of Virginia who proved the Hattori–Stong theorem.

== Early life and education ==
Stong received a B.A. and M.A. in mathematics at the University of Oklahoma. He received a Ph.D. in mathematics from the University of Chicago in 1962. His Ph.D. dissertation, Some relations among characteristic classes and numbers, was written under the supervision of Richard Lashof. He served on active duty with the United States Army Reserves from 1962 to 1965 and was stationed at Fort Benjamin Harrison and the Pentagon. He worked on computer development and rose to the rank of captain.

== Career ==
After serving with the Army, he went to the University of Oxford as a post-doctoral fellow (1964–66), and then to Princeton University as faculty (1966–68). In 1968 he became Professor of Mathematics at the University of Virginia, where he taught until his retirement in 2007. With Landweber and Ravenel, Stong introduced elliptic cohomology.

His doctoral students included Nelson Saiers.

== Selected publications ==
- Stong, Robert E. (1966). "Finite topological spaces". Transactions of the American Mathematical Society. 123 (2): 325–340. doi:10.1090/s0002-9947-1966-0195042-2. MR 0195042.
- Stong, Robert E. (1968). Notes on cobordism theory (PDF). Mathematical notes. Princeton, NJ: Princeton University Press. MR 0248858. Archived from the original (PDF) on 2010-06-23.
- Kosniowski, Czes; Stong, Robert E. (1978). "Involutions and characteristic numbers". Topology. 17 (4): 309–330. doi:10.1016/0040-9383(78)90001-0. MR 0516213.

== Sources ==
- "Robert E. Stong — Reminiscences". Archived from the original on 2016-03-04.
