= Stable homotopy theory =

Topological subject

In mathematics, stable homotopy theory is the part of homotopy theory (and thus algebraic topology) concerned with all structure and phenomena that remain after sufficiently many applications of the suspension functor. A founding result was the Freudenthal suspension theorem, which states that given any pointed space $X$, the homotopy groups $\pi_{n+k}(\Sigma^n X)$ stabilize for $n$ sufficiently large. In particular, the homotopy groups of spheres $\pi_{n+k}(S^n)$ stabilize for $n\ge k + 2$. For example,

$$\langle \text{id}_{S^1}\rangle = \Z = \pi_1(S^1)\cong \pi_2(S^2)\cong \pi_3(S^3)\cong\cdots$$
$$\langle \eta \rangle = \Z = \pi_3(S^2)\to \pi_4(S^3)\cong \pi_5(S^4)\cong\cdots$$

In the two examples above all the maps between homotopy groups are applications of the suspension functor. The first example is a standard corollary of the Hurewicz theorem, that $\pi_n(S^n)\cong \Z$. In the second example the Hopf map, $\eta$, is mapped to its suspension $\Sigma\eta$, which generates $\pi_4(S^3)\cong \Z/2$.

One of the most important problems in stable homotopy theory is the computation of stable homotopy groups of spheres. According to Freudenthal's theorem, in the stable range the homotopy groups of spheres depend not on the specific dimensions of the spheres in the domain and target, but on the difference in those dimensions. With this in mind the k-th stable stem is

$$\pi_{k}^{s}:= \lim_n \pi_{n+k}(S^n)$$.

This is an abelian group for all k. It is a theorem of Jean-Pierre Serre that these groups are finite for $k \ne 0$. In fact, composition makes $\pi_*^{S}$ into a graded ring. A theorem of Goro Nishida states that all elements of positive grading in this ring are nilpotent. Thus the only prime ideals are the primes in $\pi_0^{s} \cong \Z$. So the structure of $\pi_*^{s}$ is quite complicated.

In the modern treatment of stable homotopy theory, spaces are typically replaced by spectra. Following this line of thought, an entire stable homotopy category can be created. This category has many nice properties that are not present in the (unstable) homotopy category of spaces, following from the fact that the suspension functor becomes invertible. For example, the notion of cofibration sequence and fibration sequence are equivalent.

== See also ==
- Adams filtration
- Adams spectral sequence
- Chromatic homotopy theory
- Equivariant stable homotopy theory
- Nilpotence theorem
