= Chromatic homotopy theory =

Branch of mathematics

In mathematics, chromatic homotopy theory is a subfield of stable homotopy theory that studies complex-oriented cohomology theories from the "chromatic" point of view, which is based on Quillen's work relating cohomology theories to formal groups. In this picture, theories are classified in terms of their "chromatic levels"; i.e., the heights of the formal groups that define the theories via the Landweber exact functor theorem. Typical theories it studies include: complex K-theory, elliptic cohomology, Morava K-theory and tmf.

== Chromatic convergence theorem ==
In algebraic topology, the chromatic convergence theorem states the homotopy limit of the chromatic tower (defined below) of a finite p-local spectrum $X$ is $X$ itself. The theorem was proved by Hopkins and Ravenel.

=== Statement ===
Let $L_{E(n)}$ denotes the Bousfield localization with respect to the Morava E-theory and let $X$ be a finite, $p$-local spectrum. Then there is a tower associated to the localizations

$$\cdots \rightarrow L_{E(2)} X \rightarrow L_{E(1)} X \rightarrow L_{E(0)} X$$

called the chromatic tower, such that its homotopy limit is homotopic to the original spectrum $X$.

The stages in the tower above are often simplifications of the original spectrum. For example, $L_{E(0)} X$ is the rational localization and $L_{E(1)} X$ is the localization with respect to p-local K-theory.

==== Stable homotopy groups ====
In particular, if the $p$-local spectrum $X$ is the stable $p$-local sphere spectrum $\mathbb{S}_{(p)}$, then the homotopy limit of this sequence is the original $p$-local sphere spectrum. This is a key observation for studying stable homotopy groups of spheres using chromatic homotopy theory.

== See also ==
- Elliptic cohomology
- Redshift conjecture
- Ravenel conjectures
- Moduli stack of formal group laws
- Chromatic spectral sequence
- Adams-Novikov spectral sequence
