= Formal group law =

Concept in mathematics

In mathematics, a formal group law is (roughly speaking) a formal power series in two variables behaving as if it were the product of a Lie group. They were introduced by S. Bochner (1946). The term formal group sometimes means the same as formal group law, and sometimes means one of several generalizations. Formal groups are intermediate between Lie groups (or algebraic groups) and Lie algebras. They are used in algebraic number theory and algebraic topology.

== Definitions ==
A one-dimensional formal group law over a commutative ring R is a (formal) power series F(x,y) with coefficients in R, such that

1. F(x,y) = x + y + terms of higher degree
2. F(x, F(y,z)) = F(F(x,y), z) (associativity).

The simplest example is the additive formal group law F(x, y) = x + y. The idea of the definition is that F should be something like the formal power series expansion of the product of a Lie group, where we choose coordinates so that the identity of the Lie group is the origin.

More generally, an n-dimensional formal group law is a collection of n power series F_{i}(x_{1}, x_{2}, ..., x_{n}, y_{1}, y_{2}, ..., y_{n}) in 2n variables, such that

1. F(x,y) = x + y + terms of higher degree
2. F(x, F(y,z)) = F(F(x,y), z)

where we write F for (F_{1}, ..., F_{n}), x for (x_{1}, ..., x_{n}), and so on.

The formal group law is called commutative if F(x,y) = F(y,x). If R is torsionfree, then one can embed R into a Q-algebra and use the exponential and logarithm to write any one-dimensional formal group law F as F(x,y) = exp(log(x) + log(y)), so F is necessarily commutative. More generally, we have:

Theorem. Every one-dimensional formal group law over R is commutative if and only if R has no nonzero torsion nilpotents (i.e., no nonzero elements that are both torsion and nilpotent).

There is no need for an axiom analogous to the existence of inverse elements for groups, as this turns out to follow automatically from the definition of a formal group law. In other words we can always find a (unique) power series G such that F(x,G(x)) = 0.

A homomorphism from a formal group law F of dimension m to a formal group law G of dimension n is a collection f of n power series in m variables, such that

G(f(x), f(y)) = f(F(x,y)).

A homomorphism with an inverse is called an isomorphism, and is called a strict isomorphism if in addition f(x) = x + terms of higher degree. Two formal group laws with an isomorphism between them are essentially the same; they differ only by a "change of coordinates".

== Examples ==
- The additive formal group law is given by

$$F(x,y) = x + y.\$$

- The multiplicative formal group law is given by

$$F(x,y) = x + y + xy.\$$

This rule can be understood as follows. The product G in the (multiplicative group of the) ring R is given by G(a,b) = ab. If we "change coordinates" to make 0 the identity by putting a = 1 + x, b = 1 + y, and G = 1 + F, then we find that F(x,y) = x + y + xy.

Over the rational numbers, there is an isomorphism from the additive formal group law to the multiplicative one, given by exp(x) − 1. Over general commutative rings R there is no such homomorphism as defining it requires non-integral rational numbers, and the additive and multiplicative formal groups are usually not isomorphic.

- More generally, we can construct a formal group law of dimension n from any algebraic group or Lie group of dimension n, by taking coordinates at the identity and writing down the formal power series expansion of the product map. The additive and multiplicative formal group laws are obtained in this way from the additive and multiplicative algebraic groups. Another important special case of this is the formal group (law) of an elliptic curve (or abelian variety).
- F(x,y) = (x + y)/(1 + xy) is a formal group law coming from the addition formula for the hyperbolic tangent function: tanh(x + y) = F(tanh(x), tanh(y)), and is also the formula for addition of velocities in special relativity (with the speed of light equal to 1).
- $F(x,y) = \left. \left(x\sqrt{1-y^4} +y\sqrt{1-x^4}\right) \right/ \!(1+x^2y^2)$ is a formal group law over Z[1/2] found by Euler, in the form of the addition formula for an elliptic integral (Strickland):

$$\int_0^x{dt\over \sqrt{1-t^4}} + \int_0^y{dt\over \sqrt{1-t^4}} = \int_0^{F(x,y)}{dt\over \sqrt{1-t^4}}.$$

== Lie algebras ==
Any n-dimensional formal group law gives an n-dimensional Lie algebra over the ring R, defined in terms of the quadratic part F_{2} of the formal group law.

[x,y] = F_{2}(x,y) − F_{2}(y,x)

The natural functor from Lie groups or algebraic groups to Lie algebras can be factorized into a functor from Lie groups to formal group laws, followed by taking the Lie algebra of the formal group:

Lie groups → Formal group laws → Lie algebras

Over fields of characteristic 0, formal group laws are essentially the same as finite-dimensional Lie algebras: more precisely, the functor from finite-dimensional formal group laws to finite-dimensional Lie algebras is an equivalence of categories. Over fields of non-zero characteristic, formal group laws are not equivalent to Lie algebras. In fact, in this case it is well-known that passing from an algebraic group to its Lie algebra often throws away too much information, but passing instead to the formal group law often keeps enough information. So in some sense formal group laws are the "right" substitute for Lie algebras in characteristic p > 0.

== The logarithm of a commutative formal group law ==
If F is a commutative n-dimensional formal group law over a commutative Q-algebra R, then it is strictly isomorphic to the additive formal group law. In other words, there is a strict isomorphism f from the additive formal group to F, called the logarithm of F, so that

f(F(x,y)) = f(x) + f(y).

Examples:

- The logarithm of F(x,y) = x + y is f(x) = x.
- The logarithm of F(x,y) = x + y + xy is f(x) = log(1 + x), because log(1 + x + y + xy) = log(1 + x) + log(1 + y).

If R does not contain the rationals, a map f can be constructed by extension of scalars to R ⊗ Q, but this will send everything to zero if R has positive characteristic. Formal group laws over a ring R are often constructed by writing down their logarithm as a power series with coefficients in R ⊗ Q, and then proving that the coefficients of the corresponding formal group over R ⊗ Q actually lie in R. When working in positive characteristic, one typically replaces R with a mixed characteristic ring that has a surjection to R, such as the ring W(R) of Witt vectors, and reduces to R at the end.

=== The invariant differential ===
When F is one-dimensional, one can write its logarithm in terms of the invariant differential ω(t). Let
$$\omega(t) = \frac{\partial F}{\partial x}(0,t)^{-1} dt \in R[[t]]dt,$$
where $R[[t]] dt$ is the free $R[[t]]$-module of rank 1 on a symbol dt. Then ω is translation invariant in the sense that
$$F^* \omega = \omega,$$
where if we write $\omega(t) = p(t)dt$, then one has by definition
$$F^* \omega := p(F(t,s)) \frac{\partial F}{\partial x}(t,s) dt.$$
If one then considers the expansion $\omega(t) = (1 + c_1 t + c_2 t^2 + \dots) dt$, the formula
$$f(t) = \int \omega(t) = t + \frac{c_1}{2} t^2 + \frac{c_2}{3} t^3 + \dots$$
defines the logarithm of F.

== The formal group ring of a formal group law ==
The formal group ring of a formal group law is a cocommutative Hopf algebra analogous to the group ring of a group and to the universal enveloping algebra of a Lie algebra, both of which are also cocommutative Hopf algebras. In general cocommutative Hopf algebras behave very much like groups.

For simplicity we describe the 1-dimensional case; the higher-dimensional case is similar except that notation becomes more involved.

Suppose that F is a (1-dimensional) formal group law over R. Its formal group ring (also called its hyperalgebra or its covariant bialgebra) is a cocommutative Hopf algebra H constructed as follows.

- As an R-module, H is free with a basis 1 = D^{(0)}, D^{(1)}, D^{(2)}, ...
- The coproduct Δ is given by ΔD^{(n)} = ΣD^{(i)} ⊗ D^{(n−i)} (so the dual of this coalgebra is just the ring of formal power series).
- The counit η is given by the coefficient of D^{(0)}.
- The identity is 1 = D^{(0)}.
- The antipode S takes D^{(n)} to (−1)^{n}D^{(n)}.
- The coefficient of D^{(1)} in the product D^{(i)}D^{(j)} is the coefficient of x^{i}y^{j} in F(x,y).

Conversely, given a Hopf algebra whose coalgebra structure is given above, we can recover a formal group law F from it. So 1-dimensional formal group laws are essentially the same as Hopf algebras whose coalgebra structure is given above.

== Formal group laws as functors ==
Given an n-dimensional formal group law F over R and a commutative R-algebra S, we can form a group F(S) whose underlying set is N^{n} where N is the set of nilpotent elements of S. The product is given by using F to multiply elements of N^{n}; the point is that all the formal power series now converge because they are being applied to nilpotent elements, so there are only a finite number of nonzero terms. This makes F into a functor from commutative R-algebras S to groups.

We can extend the definition of F(S) to some topological R-algebras. In particular, if S is an inverse limit of discrete R algebras, we can define F(S) to be the inverse limit of the corresponding groups. For example, this allows us to define F(Z_{p}) with values in the p-adic numbers.

The group-valued functor of F can also be described using the formal group ring H of F. For simplicity we will assume that F is 1-dimensional; the general case is similar. For any cocommutative Hopf algebra, an element g is called group-like if Δg = g ⊗ g and εg = 1, and the group-like elements form a group under multiplication. In the case of the Hopf algebra of a formal group law over a ring, the group like elements are exactly those of the form

D^{(0)} + D^{(1)}x + D^{(2)}x^{2} + ...

for nilpotent elements x. In particular we can identify the group-like elements of H ⊗ S with the nilpotent elements of S, and the group structure on the group-like elements of H ⊗ S is then identified with the group structure on F(S).

== Height ==
Suppose that f is a homomorphism between one-dimensional formal group laws over a field of characteristic p > 0. Then f is either zero, or the first nonzero term in its power series expansion is $ax^{p^h}$ for some non-negative integer h, called the height of the homomorphism f. The height of the zero homomorphism is defined to be ∞.

The height of a one-dimensional formal group law over a field of characteristic p > 0 is defined to be the height of its multiplication by p map.

Two one-dimensional formal group laws over an algebraically closed field of characteristic p > 0 are isomorphic if and only if they have the same height, and the height can be any positive integer or ∞.

Examples:

- The additive formal group law F(x,y) = x + y has height ∞, as its pth power map is 0.
- The multiplicative formal group law F(x,y) = x + y + xy has height 1, as its pth power map is (1 + x)^{p} − 1 = x^{p}.
- The formal group law of an elliptic curve has height 1 if the curve is ordinary and height 2 if the curve is supersingular. Supersingularity can be detected by the vanishing of the Eisenstein series $E_{p-1}$.

== Lazard ring ==
There is a universal commutative one-dimensional formal group law over a universal commutative ring defined as follows. We let

F(x,y)

be

x + y + Σc_{i,j} x^{i}y^{j}

for indeterminates

c_{i,j},

and we define the universal ring R to be the commutative ring generated by the elements c_{i,j}, with the relations that are forced by the associativity and commutativity laws for formal group laws. More or less by definition, the ring R has the following universal property:

For any commutative ring S, one-dimensional formal group laws over S correspond to ring homomorphisms from R to S.

The commutative ring R constructed above is known as Lazard's universal ring. At first sight it seems to be incredibly complicated: the relations between its generators are very messy. However Lazard proved that it has a very simple structure: it is just a polynomial ring (over the integers) on generators of degrees 2, 4, 6, ... (where c_{i,j} has degree 2(i + j − 1)). Daniel Quillen proved that the coefficient ring of complex cobordism is naturally isomorphic as a graded ring to Lazard's universal ring, explaining the unusual grading.

== Formal groups ==
A formal group is a group object in the category of formal schemes.

- If $G$ is a functor from Artin algebras to groups which is left exact, then it is representable (G is the functor of points of a formal group. (left exactness of a functor is equivalent to commuting with finite projective limits).
- If $G$ is a group scheme then $\widehat{G}$, the formal completion of G at the identity, has the structure of a formal group.
- The formal completion of a smooth group scheme is isomorphic to $\mathrm{Spf}(R[[T_1,\ldots,T_n]])$. Some people call a formal group scheme smooth if the converse holds; others reserve the term "formal group" for objects locally of this form.
- Formal smoothness asserts the existence of lifts of deformations and can apply to formal schemes that are larger than points. A smooth formal group scheme is a special case of a formal group scheme.
- Given a smooth formal group, one can construct a formal group law and a field by choosing a uniformizing set of sections.
- The (non-strict) isomorphisms between formal group laws induced by change of parameters make up the elements of the group of coordinate changes on the formal group.

Formal groups and formal group laws can also be defined over arbitrary schemes, rather than just over commutative rings or fields, and families can be classified by maps from the base to a parametrizing object.

The moduli space of formal group laws is a disjoint union of infinite-dimensional affine spaces, whose components are parametrized by dimension, and whose points are parametrized by admissible coefficients of the power series F. The corresponding moduli stack of smooth formal groups is a quotient of this space by a canonical action of the infinite-dimensional groupoid of coordinate changes.

Over an algebraically closed field, the substack of one-dimensional formal groups is either a point (in characteristic zero) or an infinite chain of stacky points parametrizing heights. In characteristic zero, the closure of each point contains all points of greater height. This difference gives formal groups a rich geometric theory in positive and mixed characteristic, with connections to the Steenrod algebra, p-divisible groups, Dieudonné theory, and Galois representations. For example, the Serre-Tate theorem implies that the deformations of a group scheme are strongly controlled by those of its formal group, especially in the case of supersingular abelian varieties. For supersingular elliptic curves, this control is complete, and this is quite different from the characteristic zero situation where the formal group has no deformations.

A formal group is sometimes defined as a cocommutative Hopf algebra (usually with some extra conditions added, such as being pointed or connected). This is more or less dual to the notion above. In the smooth case, choosing coordinates is equivalent to taking a distinguished basis of the formal group ring.

Some authors use the term formal group to mean formal group law.

== Lubin–Tate formal group laws ==
We let Z_{p} be the ring of p-adic integers. The Lubin–Tate formal group law is the unique (1-dimensional) formal group law F such that e(x) = px + x^{p} is an endomorphism of F, in other words

$$e(F(x,y)) = F(e(x), e(y)).\$$

More generally we can allow e to be any power series such that e(x) = px + higher-degree terms and e(x) = x^{p} mod p. All the group laws for different choices of e satisfying these conditions are strictly isomorphic.

For each element a in Z_{p} there is a unique endomorphism f of the Lubin–Tate formal group law such that f(x) = ax + higher-degree terms. This gives an action of the ring Z_{p} on the Lubin–Tate formal group law.

There is a similar construction with Z_{p} replaced by any complete discrete valuation ring with finite residue class field.

This construction was introduced by Lubin & Tate (1965), in a successful effort to isolate the local field part of the classical theory of complex multiplication of elliptic functions. It is also a major ingredient in some approaches to local class field theory and an essential component in the construction of Morava E-theory in chromatic homotopy theory.

== See also ==
- Witt vector
- Artin–Hasse exponential
- Group functor
- Addition theorem
