= Nonabelian algebraic topology =

In mathematics, nonabelian algebraic topology studies an aspect of algebraic topology that involves (inevitably noncommutative) higher-dimensional algebras.

Many of the higher-dimensional algebraic structures are noncommutative and, therefore, their study is a very significant part of nonabelian category theory, and also of Nonabelian Algebraic Topology (NAAT), which generalises to higher dimensions ideas coming from the fundamental group. Such algebraic structures in dimensions greater than 1 develop the nonabelian character of the fundamental group, and they are in a precise sense ‘more nonabelian than the groups'. These noncommutative, or more specifically, nonabelian structures reflect more accurately the geometrical complications of higher dimensions than the known homology and homotopy groups commonly encountered in classical algebraic topology.

An important part of nonabelian algebraic topology is concerned with the properties and applications of homotopy groupoids and filtered spaces. Noncommutative double groupoids and double algebroids are only the first examples of such higher-dimensional structures that are nonabelian. The new methods of Nonabelian Algebraic Topology (NAAT) "can be applied to determine homotopy invariants of spaces, and homotopy classification of maps, in cases which include some classical results, and allow results not available by classical methods". Cubical omega-groupoids, higher homotopy groupoids, crossed modules, crossed complexes and Galois groupoids are key concepts in developing applications related to homotopy of filtered spaces, higher-dimensional space structures, the construction of the fundamental groupoid of a topos E in the general theory of topoi, and also in their physical applications in nonabelian quantum theories, and recent developments in quantum gravity, as well as categorical and topological dynamics. Further examples of such applications include the generalisations of noncommutative geometry formalizations of the noncommutative standard models via fundamental double groupoids and spacetime structures even more general than topoi or the lower-dimensional noncommutative spacetimes encountered in several topological quantum field theories and noncommutative geometry theories of quantum gravity.

A fundamental result in NAAT is the generalised, higher homotopy van Kampen theorem proven by R. Brown, which states that "the homotopy type of a topological space can be computed by a suitable colimit or homotopy colimit over homotopy types of its pieces''. A related example is that of van Kampen theorems for categories of covering morphisms in lextensive categories. Other reports of generalisations of the van Kampen theorem include statements for 2-categories and a topos of topoi. Important results in higher-dimensional algebra are also the extensions of the Galois theory in categories and variable categories, or indexed/'parametrized' categories. The Joyal–Tierney representation theorem for topoi is also a generalisation of the Galois theory. Thus, indexing by bicategories in the sense of Benabou one also includes here the Joyal–Tierney theory.
