= Ronald Brown (mathematician) =

English mathematician (1935–2024)

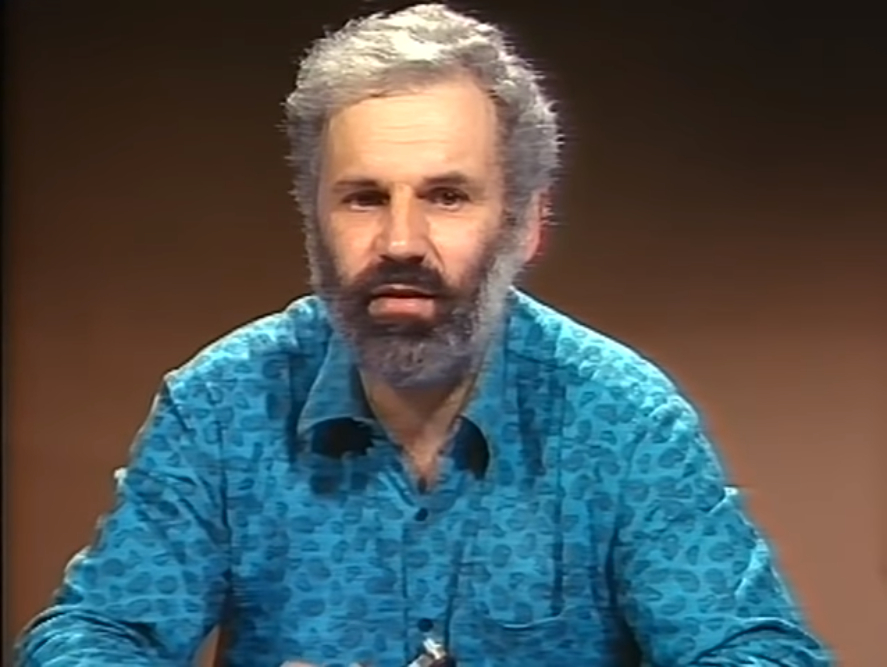
- Brown in a 1987 lecture video
- Born: 4 January 1935; London, England
- Died: 6 December 2024 (aged 89); Deganwy, Wales
- Education: University of Oxford
- Scientific career
- Fields: Mathematics
- Workplaces: University of Liverpool; University of Hull; Bangor University
- Thesis: Some problems of algebraic topology (1962)
- Doctoral advisors: J. H. C. Whitehead; Michael G. Barratt
- Doctoral students: 21

Ronald Brown FLSW (born 4 January 1935 – 6 December 2024) was an English mathematician. He was a Professor in the School of Computer Science at Bangor University. He authored many books and more than 160 journal articles. Brown died on 6 December 2024, at the age of 89.

== Education and career ==
Born on 4 January 1935 in London, Brown attended Oxford University, obtaining a B.A. in 1956 and a D.Phil. in 1962. Brown began his teaching career during his doctorate work, serving as an assistant lecturer at the University of Liverpool before assuming the position of Lecturer. In 1964, he took a position at the University of Hull, serving first as a Senior Lecturer and then as a Reader before becoming a Professor of pure mathematics at Bangor University, then a part of the University of Wales, in 1970.

Brown served as Professor of Pure Mathematics for 30 years; he also served during the 1983–84 term as a Professor for one month at Louis Pasteur University in Strasbourg. In 1999, Brown took a half-time research professorship until he became Professor Emeritus in 2001. He was elected as a Fellow of the Learned Society of Wales in 2016.

== Editing and writing ==
Brown served as an editor or on the editorial board for a number of print and electronic journals. He began in 1968 with the Chapman & Hall Mathematics Series, contributing through 1986. In 1975, he joined the editorial advisory board of the London Mathematical Society, remaining through 1994. Two years later, he joined the editorial board of Applied Categorical Structures, continuing through 2007. From 1995 and 1999, respectively, he has been active with the electronic journals Theory and Applications of Categories and Homology, Homotopy and Applications, which he helped found. Since 2006, he has been involved with Journal of Homotopy and Related Structures. His mathematical research interests ranged from algebraic topology and groupoids, to homology theory, category theory, mathematical biology, mathematical physics and higher-dimensional algebra.

Brown authored or edited a number of books and over 160 academic papers published in academic journals or collections. His first published paper was "Ten topologies for X × Y", which was published in the Quarterly Journal of Mathematics in 1963. Since then, his publications have appeared in many journals, including but not limited to the Journal of Algebra, Proceedings of the American Mathematical Society, Mathematische Zeitschrift, College Mathematics Journal, and American Mathematical Monthly. He was also known for several recent co-authored papers on categorical ontology.

Among his several books and standard topology and algebraic topology textbooks are: Elements of Modern Topology (1968), Low-Dimensional Topology (1979, co-edited with T.L. Thickstun), Topology: a geometric account of general topology, homotopy types, and the fundamental groupoid (1998), Topology and Groupoids (2006) and Nonabelian Algebraic Topology: Filtered Spaces, Crossed Complexes, Cubical Homotopy Groupoids (EMS, 2010).

His recent fundamental results that extend the classical Van Kampen theorem to higher homotopy in higher dimensions (HHSvKT) are of substantial interest for solving several problems in algebraic topology, both old and new. Moreover, developments in algebraic topology have often had wider implications, as for example in algebraic geometry and also in algebraic number theory. Such higher-dimensional (HHSvKT) theorems are about homotopy invariants of structured spaces, and especially those for filtered spaces or n-cubes of spaces. An example is the fact that the relative Hurewicz theorem is a consequence of HHSvKT, and this then suggested a triadic Hurewicz theorem.

== See also ==
- Higher-dimensional algebra
- Higher category theory
- Seifert–van Kampen theorem
- Groupoids
- Algebraic topology
- Nonabelian algebraic topology
- R-algebroids
- Double groupoids
- Homology (mathematics)
- Alexander Grothendieck
- arXiv
