= Eckmann–Hilton argument =

Mathematical theorem

In mathematics, the Eckmann–Hilton argument (or Eckmann–Hilton principle or Eckmann–Hilton theorem) is an argument about two unital magma structures on a set where one is a homomorphism for the other. Given this, the structures are the same, and the resulting magma is a commutative monoid. This can then be used to prove the commutativity of the higher homotopy groups. The principle is named after Beno Eckmann and Peter Hilton, who used it in a 1962 paper.

== The Eckmann–Hilton result ==
Let $X$ be a set equipped with two binary operations, which we will write $\circ$ and $\otimes$, and suppose:

1. $\circ$ and $\otimes$ are both unital, meaning that there are identity elements $1_\circ$ and $1_\otimes$ of $X$ such that $1_\circ \circ a= a =a \circ 1_\circ$ and $1_\otimes \otimes a= a =a \otimes 1_\otimes$, for all $a\in X$.
2. $(a \otimes b) \circ (c \otimes d) = (a \circ c) \otimes (b \circ d)$ for all $a,b,c,d \in X$.

Then $\circ$ and $\otimes$ are the same and in fact commutative and associative.

=== Remarks ===
The operations $\otimes$ and $\circ$ are often referred to as monoid structures or multiplications, but this suggests they are assumed to be associative, a property that is not required for the proof. In fact, associativity follows. Likewise, we do not have to require that the two operations have the same neutral element; this is a consequence.

== Proof ==
First, observe that the units of the two operations coincide: $1_\circ = 1_\circ \circ 1_\circ = (1_\otimes \otimes 1_\circ) \circ (1_\circ \otimes 1_\otimes) = (1_\otimes \circ 1_\circ) \otimes (1_\circ \circ 1_\otimes) = 1_\otimes \otimes 1_\otimes = 1_\otimes$.

Now, let $a,b \in X$. Then $a \circ b = (1 \otimes a) \circ (b \otimes 1) = (1 \circ b) \otimes (a \circ 1) = b \otimes a = (b \circ 1) \otimes (1 \circ a) = (b \otimes 1) \circ (1 \otimes a) = b \circ a$. This establishes that the two operations coincide and are commutative.

For associativity, $(a \otimes b) \otimes c = (a \otimes b) \otimes (1 \otimes c) = (a \otimes 1) \otimes (b \otimes c) = a \otimes (b \otimes c)$.

== Two-dimensional proof ==
The above proof also has a "two-dimensional" presentation that better illustrates the application to higher homotopy groups. For this version of the proof, we write the two operations as vertical and horizontal juxtaposition, i.e.,
$$\begin{matrix}a\\[-60pt]b\end{matrix}$$
and $a \ b$. The interchange property can then be expressed as follows:

For all $a,b,c,d\in X$,
$$\begin{matrix}(a \ b)\\[-60pt](c \ d)\end{matrix} = \begin{pmatrix}a\\[-60pt]c\end{pmatrix} \begin{pmatrix}b\\[-60pt]d\end{pmatrix}$$
, so we can write
$$\begin{matrix}
a \ b \\[-60pt]
c \ d
\end{matrix}$$
without ambiguity.

Let $\bullet$ and $\circ$ be the units for vertical and horizontal composition respectively. Then
$$\bullet =
\begin{matrix}\bullet \\[-60pt]
\bullet
\end{matrix}
=
\begin{matrix}
\bullet \ \ \circ \\[-60pt]
\circ \ \ \bullet
\end{matrix}
= \circ \ \circ = \circ$$
, so both units are equal.

Now, for all $a,b\in X$,
$$a \ b =
\begin{matrix}
a \ \ \bullet\\[-60pt]
\bullet \ \ b
\end{matrix}
= \begin{matrix}a \\[-60pt] b\end{matrix}
=
\begin{matrix}
\bullet \ \ a \\[-60pt]
b \ \ \bullet
\end{matrix}
= b \ a =
\begin{matrix}
b \ \ \bullet \\[-60pt]
\bullet \ \ a
\end{matrix}
= \begin{matrix}b \\[-60pt] a\end{matrix}$$
, so horizontal composition is the same as vertical composition and both operations are commutative.

Finally, for all $a,b,c\in X$,
$$a \ (b \ c) = a\ \begin{pmatrix}b\\[-60pt]c\end{pmatrix} =
\begin{matrix}
a \ \ b\\[-60pt]
\bullet \ \ c
\end{matrix}
=
\begin{matrix}
(a \ b) \\[-60pt]
c
\end{matrix}
= (a \ b) \ c$$
, so composition is associative.

== Remarks ==
If the operations are associative, each one defines the structure of a monoid on $X$, and the conditions above are equivalent to the more abstract condition that $\otimes$ is a monoid homomorphism $(X,\circ)\times(X,\circ)\to(X,\circ)$ (or vice versa). An even more abstract way of stating the theorem is: If $X$ is a monoid object in the category of monoids, then $X$ is in fact a commutative monoid.

It is important that a similar argument does not give such a trivial result in the case of monoid objects in the categories of small categories or of groupoids. Instead the notion of group object in the category of groupoids turns out to be equivalent to the notion of crossed module. This leads to the idea of using multiple groupoid objects in homotopy theory.

More generally, the Eckmann–Hilton argument is a special case of the use of the interchange law in the theory of (strict) double and multiple categories. A (strict) double category is a set, or class, equipped with two category structures, each of which is a morphism for the other structure. If the compositions in the two category structures are written $\circ, \otimes$ then the interchange law reads

$$(a \circ b) \otimes (c \circ d) = (a \otimes c) \circ (b \otimes d)$$

whenever both sides are defined. For an example of its use, and some discussion, see the paper of Higgins referenced below. The interchange law implies that a double category contains a family of abelian monoids.

The history in relation to homotopy groups is interesting. The workers in topology of the early 20th century were aware that the nonabelian fundamental group was of use in geometry and analysis; that abelian homology groups could be defined in all dimensions; and that for a connected space, the first homology group was the fundamental group made abelian (see Hurewicz theorem). So there was a desire to generalise the nonabelian fundamental group to all dimensions.

In 1932, Eduard Čech submitted a paper on higher homotopy groups to the International Congress of Mathematics at Zürich. However, Pavel Alexandroff and Heinz Hopf quickly proved these groups were abelian for $n > 1$, and on these grounds persuaded Čech to withdraw his paper, so that only a small paragraph appeared in the Proceedings. It is said that Witold Hurewicz attended this conference, and his first work on higher homotopy groups appeared in 1935. Thus the dreams of the early topologists have long been regarded as a mirage.

Cubical higher homotopy groupoids are constructed for filtered spaces in the book Nonabelian algebraic topology cited below, which develops basic algebraic topology, including higher analogues to the Seifert–Van Kampen theorem, without using singular homology or simplicial approximation.
