= Homotopy theory =

Branch of mathematics

In mathematics, homotopy theory is a systematic study of situations in which maps can come with homotopies between them. It originated as a topic in algebraic topology, but nowadays is learned as an independent discipline.

== Applications to other fields of mathematics ==
Besides algebraic topology, the theory has also been used in other areas of mathematics such as:

- Algebraic geometry (e.g., A^{1} homotopy theory)
- Category theory (specifically the study of higher categories)
- Noncommutative geometry (e.g., KK-theory and Noncommutative topology)

== Concepts ==
=== Spaces and maps ===
In homotopy theory and algebraic topology, the word "space" denotes a topological space. In order to avoid pathologies, one rarely works with arbitrary spaces; instead, one requires spaces to meet extra constraints, such as being compactly generated weak Hausdorff or a CW complex.

In the same vein as above, a "map" is a continuous function, possibly with some extra constraints.

Often, one works with a pointed space—that is, a space with a "distinguished point", called a basepoint. A pointed map is then a map which preserves basepoints; that is, it sends the basepoint of the domain to that of the codomain. In contrast, a free map is one which needn't preserve basepoints.

The Cartesian product of two pointed spaces $X, Y$ are not naturally pointed. A substitute is the smash product $X \wedge Y$ which is characterized by the adjoint relation

$$\operatorname{Map}(X \wedge Y, Z) = \operatorname{Map}(X, \operatorname{Map}(Y, Z))$$,

that is, a smash product is an analog of a tensor product in abstract algebra (see tensor-hom adjunction). Explicitly, $X \wedge Y$ is the quotient of $X \times Y$ by the wedge sum $X \vee Y$.

=== Homotopy ===
Let I denote the unit interval $[0, 1]$. A map

$$h: X \times I \to Y$$

is called a homotopy from the map $h_0$ to the map $h_1$, where $h_t(x) = h(x, t)$. Intuitively, we may think of $h$ as a path from the map $h_0$ to the map $h_1$. Indeed, a homotopy can be shown to be an equivalence relation. When X, Y are pointed spaces, the maps $h_t$ are required to preserve the basepoint and the homotopy $h$ is called a based homotopy. A based homotopy is the same as a (based) map $X \wedge I_+ \to Y$ where $I_+$ is $I$ together with a disjoint basepoint.

Given a pointed space X and an integer $n \ge 0$, let $\pi_n X = [S^n, X]$ be the homotopy classes of based maps $S^n \to X$ from a (pointed) n-sphere $S^n$ to X. As it turns out,

- for $n \ge 1$, $\pi_n X$ are groups called homotopy groups; in particular, $\pi_1 X$ is called the fundamental group of X,
- for $n \ge 2$, $\pi_n X$ are abelian groups by the Eckmann–Hilton argument,
- $\pi_0 X$ can be identified with the set of path-connected components in $X$.

Every group is the fundamental group of some space.

A map $f$ is called a homotopy equivalence if there is another map $g$ such that $f \circ g$ and $g \circ f$ are both homotopic to the identities. Two spaces are said to be homotopy equivalent if there is a homotopy equivalence between them. A homotopy equivalence class of spaces is then called a homotopy type. There is a weaker notion: a map $f : X \to Y$ is said to be a weak homotopy equivalence if $f_* : \pi_n(X) \to \pi_n(Y)$ is an isomorphism for each $n \ge 0$ and each choice of a base point. A homotopy equivalence is a weak homotopy equivalence but the converse need not be true.

Through the adjunction

$$\operatorname{Map}(X \times I, Y) = \operatorname{Map}(X, \operatorname{Map}(I, Y)), \,\, h \mapsto (x \mapsto h(x, \cdot))$$,

a homotopy $h : X \times I \to Y$ is sometimes viewed as a map $X \to Y^I = \operatorname{Map}(I, Y)$.

=== CW complex ===
A CW complex is a space that has a filtration $X \supset \cdots \supset X^n \supset X^{n-1} \supset \cdots \supset X^0$ whose union is $X$ and such that:

1. $X^0$ is a discrete space, called the set of 0-cells (vertices) in $X$.
2. Each $X^n$ is obtained by attaching several n-disks, n-cells, to $X^{n-1}$ via maps $S^{n-1} \to X^{n-1}$; i.e., the boundary of an n-disk is identified with the image of $S^{n-1}$ in $X^{n-1}$.
3. A subset $U$ is open if and only if $U \cap X^n$ is open for each $n$.

For example, a sphere $S^n$ has two cells: one 0-cell and one $n$-cell, since $S^n$ can be obtained by collapsing the boundary $S^{n-1}$ of the n-disk to a point. In general, every manifold has the homotopy type of a CW complex (because a manifold is an absolute neighborhood retract). More explicitly, Morse theory implies that a compact manifold has the homotopy type of a finite CW complex.

Remarkably, Whitehead's theorem says that for CW complexes, a weak homotopy equivalence and a homotopy equivalence are the same thing.

Another important result is the approximation theorem. First, the homotopy category of spaces is the category where an object is a space but a morphism is the homotopy class of a map. Then

CW approximation— There exist a functor (called the CW approximation functor)

$$\Theta : \operatorname{Ho}(\textrm{spaces}) \to \operatorname{Ho}(\textrm{CW})$$

from the homotopy category of spaces to the homotopy category of CW complexes as well as a natural transformation

$$\theta : i \circ \Theta \to \operatorname{Id},$$

where $i : \operatorname{Ho}(\textrm{CW}) \hookrightarrow \operatorname{Ho}(\textrm{spaces})$, such that each $\theta_X : i(\Theta(X)) \to X$ is a weak homotopy equivalence.

Similar statements also hold for pairs and excisive triads.

Explicitly, the above approximation functor can be defined as the composition of the singular chain functor $S_*$ followed by the geometric realization functor; see § Simplicial set.

The above theorem justifies a common habit of working only with CW complexes. For example, given a space $X$, one can just define the homology of $X$ to the homology of the CW approximation of $X$ (the cell structure of a CW complex determines the natural homology, the cellular homology and that can be taken to be the homology of the complex.)

Depending on spaces, sometimes better approximation theorems may be available; e.g., simplicial approximation or smooth approximation.

=== Cofibration and fibration ===
A map $f: A \to X$ is called a cofibration if given:

1. A map $h_0 : X \to Z$, and
2. A homotopy $g_t : A \to Z$

such that $h_0 \circ f = g_0$, there exists a homotopy $h_t : X \to Z$ that extends $h_0$ and such that $h_t \circ f = g_t$. An example is a neighborhood deformation retract; that is, $X$ contains a mapping cylinder neighborhood of a closed subspace $A$ and $f$ the inclusion (e.g., a tubular neighborhood of a closed submanifold). In fact, a cofibration can be characterized as a neighborhood deformation retract pair. Another basic example is a CW pair $(X, A)$; many often work only with CW complexes and the notion of a cofibration there is then often implicit.

A fibration in the sense of Hurewicz is the dual notion of a cofibration: that is, a map $p : X \to B$ is a fibration if given (1) a map $h_0 : Z \to X$ and (2) a homotopy $g_t : Z \to B$ such that $p \circ h_0 = g_0$, there exists a homotopy $h_t: Z \to X$ that extends $h_0$ and such that $p \circ h_t = g_t$.

While a cofibration is characterized by the existence of a retract, a fibration is characterized by the existence of a section called the path lifting as follows. Let $p': Np \to B^I$ be the pull-back of a map $p : E \to B$ along $\chi \mapsto \chi(1) : B^I \to B$, called the mapping path space of $p$. Viewing $p'$ as a homotopy $N p\times I \to B$ (see § Homotopy), if $p$ is a fibration, then $p'$ gives a homotopy

$$s: Np \to E^I$$

such that $s(e, \chi)(0) = e, \, (p^I \circ s)(e, \chi) = \chi$ where $p^I : E^I \to B^I$ is given by $p$. This $s$ is called the path lifting associated to $p$. Conversely, if there is a path lifting $s$, then $p$ is a fibration as a required homotopy is obtained via $s$.

A basic example of a fibration is a covering map as it comes with a unique path lifting. If $E$ is a principal G-bundle over a paracompact space, that is, a space with a free and transitive (topological) group action of a (topological) group, then the projection map $p: E \to X$ is a fibration, because a Hurewicz fibration can be checked locally on a paracompact space.

While a cofibration is injective with closed image, a fibration need not be surjective.

There are also based versions of a cofibration and a fibration (namely, the maps are required to be based).

=== Lifting property ===
A pair of maps $i : A \to X$ and $p : E \to B$ is said to satisfy the lifting property if for each commutative square diagram

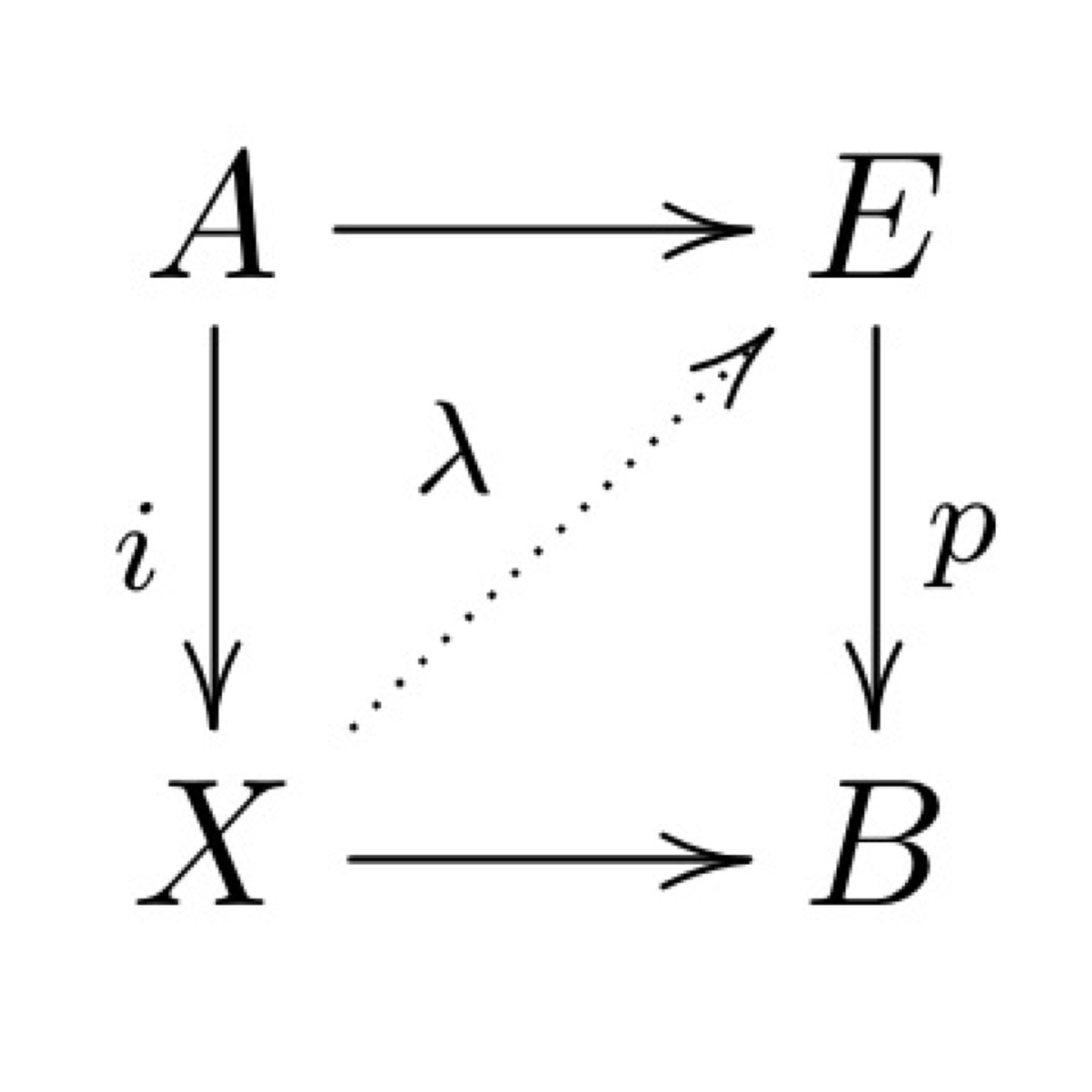

there is a map $\lambda$ that makes the above diagram still commute. (The notion originates in the theory of model categories.)

Let $\mathfrak{c}$ be a class of maps. Then a map $p : E \to B$ is said to satisfy the right lifting property or the RLP if $p$ satisfies the above lifting property for each $i$ in $\mathfrak{c}$. Similarly, a map $i : A \to X$ is said to satisfy the left lifting property or the LLP if it satisfies the lifting property for each $p$ in $\mathfrak{c}$.

For example, a Hurewicz fibration is exactly a map $p : E \to B$ that satisfies the RLP for the inclusions $i_0 : A \to A \times I$. A Serre fibration is a map satisfying the RLP for the inclusions $i : S^{n - 1} \to D^n$ where $S^{-1}$ is the empty set. A Hurewicz fibration is a Serre fibration and the converse holds for CW complexes.

On the other hand, a cofibration is exactly a map satisfying the LLP for evaluation maps $p: B^I \to B$ at $0$.

=== Loop and suspension ===
On the category of pointed spaces, there are two important functors: the loop functor $\Omega$ and the (reduced) suspension functor $\Sigma$, which are in the adjoint relation. Precisely, they are defined as

- $\Omega X = \operatorname{Map}(S^1, X)$, and
- $\Sigma X = X \wedge S^1$.

Because of the adjoint relation between a smash product and a mapping space, we have:

$$\operatorname{Map}(\Sigma X, Y) = \operatorname{Map}(X, \Omega Y).$$

These functors are used to construct fiber sequences and cofiber sequences. Namely, if $f : X \to Y$ is a map, the fiber sequence generated by $f$ is the exact sequence

$$\cdots \to \Omega^2 Ff \to \Omega^2 X \to \Omega^2 Y \to \Omega Ff \to \Omega X \to \Omega Y \to Ff \to X \to Y$$

where $Ff$ is the homotopy fiber of $f$; i.e., a fiber obtained after replacing $f$ by a (based) fibration. The cofibration sequence generated by $f$ is $X \to Y \to C f \to \Sigma X \to \cdots,$ where $Cf$ is the homotopy cofiber of $f$ constructed like a homotopy fiber (use a quotient instead of a fiber.)

The functors $\Omega, \Sigma$ restrict to the category of CW complexes in the following weak sense: a theorem of Milnor says that if $X$ has the homotopy type of a CW complex, then so does its loop space $\Omega X$.

=== Classifying spaces and homotopy operations ===
Given a topological group G, the classifying space for principal G-bundles ("the" up to equivalence) is a space $BG$ such that, for each space X,

$[X, BG] =$ {principal G-bundle on X} / ~ $, \,\, [f] \mapsto [f^* EG]$

where

- the left-hand side is the set of homotopy classes of maps $X \to BG$,
- ~ refers isomorphism of bundles, and
- = is given by pulling-back the distinguished bundle $EG$ on $BG$ (called universal bundle) along a map $X \to BG$.

Brown's representability theorem guarantees the existence of classifying spaces.

=== Spectrum and generalized cohomology ===
The idea that a classifying space classifies principal bundles can be pushed further. For example, one might try to classify cohomology classes: given an abelian group A (such as $\mathbb{Z}$),

$$[X, K(A, n)] = \operatorname{H}^n(X; A)$$

where $K(A, n)$ is the Eilenberg–MacLane space. The above equation leads to the notion of a generalized cohomology theory; i.e., a contravariant functor from the category of spaces to the category of abelian groups that satisfies the axioms generalizing ordinary cohomology theory. As it turns out, such a functor may not be representable by a space but it can always be represented by a sequence of (pointed) spaces with structure maps called a spectrum. In other words, to give a generalized cohomology theory is to give a spectrum. A K-theory is an example of a generalized cohomology theory.

A basic example of a spectrum is a sphere spectrum: $S^0 \to S^1 \to S^2 \to \cdots$

== Calculations ==
=== Homotopy groups of spheres ===
First of all, we have:

$\pi_k S^n = 0$ for $k < n$.

This can be seen by the smooth or simplicial approximation theorem. Indeed, given a $f : S^k \to S^n$, $f$ is homotopic to a map that is not surjective (all the maps involved are based). But a sphere with a point removed is contractible.

Let $p : \mathbb{R} \to S^1$ be the universal cover; explicitly, $p(t) = e^{2\pi i t}$. Then, taking the long exact sequence of homotopy groups, we get

$$* = \pi_1 \mathbb{R} \to \pi_1 S^1 \to \pi_0 F \to \pi_0 S^1 = *$$

where F is a fiber. Thus, $\pi_1 S^1 \simeq \pi_0 F = \mathbb{Z}$, since F is a lattice. Using the Hopf bundle $S^1 \to S^3 \to S^2$, by a similar calculation, we also get:

$$\pi_2 S^2 = \mathbb{Z}.$$

Alternatively, we can also use the Hurewicz theorem to do calculations.

=== Homotopy groups of Lie groups ===
There is a homomorphism called the J-homomorphism

$$\pi_k SO(n) \to \pi_{n+k} S^n.$$

== Key theorems ==
- Seifert–van Kampen theorem
- Homotopy excision theorem
- Freudenthal suspension theorem (a corollary of the excision theorem)
- Landweber exact functor theorem
- Dold–Kan correspondence
- Eckmann–Hilton argument - this shows for instance higher homotopy groups are abelian.
- Universal coefficient theorem
- Dold–Thom theorem

== Obstruction theory and characteristic class ==
See also: Characteristic class, Postnikov tower, Whitehead torsion

== Specific theories ==
There are several specific theories

- simple homotopy theory
- stable homotopy theory
- chromatic homotopy theory
- rational homotopy theory
- p-adic homotopy theory
- equivariant homotopy theory
- simplicial homotopy theory

== Homotopy hypothesis ==
One of the basic questions in the foundations of homotopy theory is the nature of a space. The homotopy hypothesis asks whether a space is something fundamentally algebraic.

If one prefers to work with a space instead of a pointed space, there is the notion of a fundamental groupoid (and higher variants): by definition, the fundamental groupoid of a space X is the category where the objects are the points of X and the morphisms are paths.

== Abstract homotopy theory ==
Abstract homotopy theory is an axiomatic approach to homotopy theory. Such axiomatization is useful for non-traditional applications of homotopy theory. One approach to axiomatization is by Quillen's model categories. A model category is a category with a choice of three classes of maps called weak equivalences, cofibrations and fibrations, subject to the axioms that are reminiscent of facts in algebraic topology. For example, the category of (reasonable) topological spaces has a structure of a model category where a weak equivalence is a weak homotopy equivalence, a cofibration a certain retract and a fibration a Serre fibration. Another example is the category of non-negatively graded chain complexes over a fixed base ring.

=== Simplicial set ===
A simplicial set is an abstract generalization of a simplicial complex and can play a role of a "space" in some sense. Despite the name, it is not a set but is a sequence of sets together with the certain maps (face and degeneracy) between those sets.

For example, given a space $X$, for each integer $n \ge 0$, let $S_n X$ be the set of all maps from the n-simplex to $X$. Then the sequence $S_n X$ of sets is a simplicial set. Each simplicial set $K = \{ K_n \}_{n \ge 0}$ has a naturally associated chain complex and the homology of that chain complex is the homology of $K$. The singular homology of $X$ is precisely the homology of the simplicial set $S_* X$. Also, the geometric realization $| \cdot |$ of a simplicial set is a CW complex and the composition $X \mapsto |S_* X|$ is precisely the CW approximation functor.

Another important example is a category or more precisely the nerve of a category, which is a simplicial set. In fact, a simplicial set is the nerve of some category if and only if it satisfies the Segal conditions (a theorem of Grothendieck). Each category is completely determined by its nerve. In this way, a category can be viewed as a special kind of a simplicial set, and this observation is used to generalize a category. Namely, an $\infty$-category or an $\infty$-groupoid is defined as particular kinds of simplicial sets.

Since simplicial sets are sort of abstract spaces (if not topological spaces), it is possible to develop the homotopy theory on them, which is called the simplicial homotopy theory.

== See also ==
- Highly structured ring spectrum
- Homotopy type theory
- Pursuing Stacks
- Shape theory
- Eilenberg Obstruction Theory
- Moduli stack of formal group laws
- Crossed module
- Milnor's theorem on Kan complexes
- Fibration of simplicial sets
- Shape theory
- Absolute neighborhood retract
