= Higher-dimensional algebra =

Study of categorified structures

In mathematics, especially (higher) category theory, higher-dimensional algebra is the study of categorified structures. It has applications in nonabelian algebraic topology, and generalizes abstract algebra.

== Higher-dimensional categories ==
A first step towards defining higher dimensional algebras is the concept of 2-category of higher category theory, followed by the more 'geometric' concept of double category.

A higher level concept is thus defined as a category of categories, or super-category, which generalises to higher dimensions the notion of category – regarded as any structure which is an interpretation of Lawvere's axioms of the elementary theory of abstract categories (ETAC). Thus, a supercategory and also a super-category, can be regarded as natural extensions of the concepts of meta-category, multicategory, and multi-graph, k-partite graph, or colored graph (see a color figure, and also its definition in graph theory).

Supercategories were first introduced in 1970, and were subsequently developed for applications in theoretical physics (especially quantum field theory and topological quantum field theory) and mathematical biology or mathematical biophysics.

Other pathways in higher-dimensional algebra involve: bicategories, homomorphisms of bicategories, variable categories (also known as indexed or parametrized categories), topoi, effective descent, and enriched and internal categories.

== Double groupoids ==
In higher-dimensional algebra (HDA), a double groupoid is a generalisation of a one-dimensional groupoid to two dimensions, and the latter groupoid can be considered as a special case of a category with all invertible arrows, or morphisms.

Double groupoids are often used to capture information about geometrical objects such as higher-dimensional manifolds (or n-dimensional manifolds). In general, an n-dimensional manifold is a space that locally looks like an n-dimensional Euclidean space, but whose global structure may be non-Euclidean.

Double groupoids were first introduced by Ronald Brown in Double groupoids and crossed modules (1976), and were further developed towards applications in nonabelian algebraic topology. A related, 'dual' concept is that of a double algebroid, and the more general concept of R-algebroid.

== Nonabelian algebraic topology ==
See Nonabelian algebraic topology

== Applications ==
=== Theoretical physics ===
In quantum field theory, there exist quantum categories. and quantum double groupoids. One can consider quantum double groupoids to be fundamental groupoids defined via a 2-functor, which allows one to think about the physically interesting case of quantum fundamental groupoids (QFGs) in terms of the bicategory Span(Groupoids), and then constructing 2-Hilbert spaces and 2-linear maps for manifolds and cobordisms. At the next step, one obtains cobordisms with corners via natural transformations of such 2-functors. A claim was then made that, with the gauge group SU(2), "the extended TQFT, or ETQFT, gives a theory equivalent to the Ponzano–Regge model of quantum gravity"; similarly, the Turaev–Viro model would be then obtained with representations of SU_{q}(2). Therefore, one can describe the state space of a gauge theory – or many kinds of quantum field theories (QFTs) and local quantum physics, in terms of the transformation groupoids given by symmetries, as for example in the case of a gauge theory, by the gauge transformations acting on states that are, in this case, connections. In the case of symmetries related to quantum groups, one would obtain structures that are representation categories of quantum groupoids, instead of the 2-vector spaces that are representation categories of groupoids.

=== Quantum physics ===
- Quantum Algebraic Topology
- Quantum geometry
- Quantum gravity
- Quantum group
- Topological quantum field theory
- Local quantum field theory

== See also ==
- Timeline of category theory and related mathematics
- Higher category theory
- Ronald Brown
- Lie algebroid
- Double groupoid
- Anabelian geometry
- Noncommutative geometry
- Categorical algebra
- Grothendieck's Galois theory
- Grothendieck topology
- Topological dynamics
- Categorical dynamics
- Crossed module
- Pseudoalgebra
- 2-ring
- Lie n-algebra
