= Whitehead theorem =

Theorem in homotopy theory

In homotopy theory (a branch of mathematics), the Whitehead theorem states that if a continuous mapping f between CW complexes X and Y induces isomorphisms on all homotopy groups, then f is a homotopy equivalence. This result was proved by J. H. C. Whitehead in two landmark papers from 1949, and provides a justification for working with the concept of a CW complex that he introduced there. It is a model result of algebraic topology, in which the behavior of certain algebraic invariants (in this case, homotopy groups) determines a topological property of a mapping.

== Statement ==
In more detail, let X and Y be topological spaces. Given a continuous mapping

$$f\colon X \to Y$$

and a point x in X, consider for any n ≥ 0 the induced homomorphism

$$f_*\colon \pi_n(X,x) \to \pi_n(Y,f(x)),$$

where π_{n}(X,x) denotes the n-th homotopy group of X with base point x. (For n = 0, π_{0}(X) just means the set of path components of X.) A map f is a weak homotopy equivalence if the function

$$f_*\colon \pi_0(X) \to \pi_0(Y)$$

is bijective, and the homomorphisms $f_*$ are bijective for all x in X and all n ≥ 1. (For X and Y path-connected, the first condition is automatic, and it suffices to state the second condition for a single point x in X.) The Whitehead theorem states that a weak homotopy equivalence from one CW complex to another is a homotopy equivalence. (That is, the map f: X → Y has a homotopy inverse g: Y → X, which is not at all clear from the assumptions.) This implies the same conclusion for spaces X and Y that are homotopy equivalent to CW complexes.

Combining this with the Hurewicz theorem yields a useful corollary: a continuous map $f\colon X \to Y$ between simply connected CW complexes that induces an isomorphism on all integral homology groups is a homotopy equivalence.

== Spaces with isomorphic homotopy groups may not be homotopy equivalent ==
A word of caution: it is not enough to assume π_{n}(X) is isomorphic to π_{n}(Y) for each n in order to conclude that X and Y are homotopy equivalent. One really needs a map f : X → Y inducing an isomorphism on homotopy groups. For instance, take X= S^{2} × RP^{3} and Y= RP^{2} × S^{3}. Then X and Y have the same fundamental group, namely the cyclic group Z/2, and the same universal cover, namely S^{2} × S^{3}; thus, they have isomorphic homotopy groups. On the other hand, their homology groups are different (as can be seen from the Künneth formula); thus, X and Y are not homotopy equivalent.

The Whitehead theorem does not hold for general topological spaces or even for all subspaces of R^{n}. For example, the Warsaw circle, a compact subset of the plane, has all homotopy groups zero, but the map from the Warsaw circle to a single point is not a homotopy equivalence. The study of possible generalizations of Whitehead's theorem to more general spaces is part of the subject of shape theory.
