= R-algebroid =

In mathematics, R-algebroids are constructed starting from groupoids. These are more abstract concepts than the Lie algebroids that play a similar role in the theory of Lie groupoids to that of Lie algebras in the theory of Lie groups. (Thus, a Lie algebroid can be thought of as 'a Lie algebra with many objects ').

== Definition ==
An R-algebroid, $R\mathsf{G}$, is constructed from a groupoid $\mathsf{G}$ as follows. The object set of $R\mathsf{G}$ is the same as that of $\mathsf{G}$ and $R\mathsf{G}(b,c)$ is the free R-module on the set $\mathsf{G}(b,c)$, with composition given by the usual bilinear rule, extending the composition of $\mathsf{G}$.

== R-category ==
A groupoid $\mathsf{G}$ can be regarded as a category with invertible morphisms. Then an R-category is defined as an extension of the R-algebroid concept by replacing the groupoid $\mathsf{G}$ in this construction with a general category C that does not have all morphisms invertible.

== R-algebroids via convolution products ==
One can also define the R-algebroid, ${\bar R}\mathsf{G}:=R\mathsf{G}(b,c)$, to be the set of functions $\mathsf{G}(b,c){\longrightarrow}R$ with finite support, and with the convolution product defined as follows: $\displaystyle (f*g)(z)= \sum \{(fx)(gy)\mid z=x\circ y \}$ .

Only this second construction is natural for the topological case, when one needs to replace 'function' by 'continuous function with compact support', and in this case $R\cong \mathbb{C}$.

== Examples ==
- Every Lie algebra is a Lie algebroid over the one point manifold.
- The Lie algebroid associated to a Lie groupoid.

== See also ==
- Algebraic category
- Algebroid (disambiguation)
- Bialgebra
- Bicategory
- Convolution product
- Crossed module
- Double groupoid
- Higher-dimensional algebra
- Hopf algebra
- Module (mathematics)
- Ring (mathematics)
