= J. H. C. Whitehead =

British mathematician (1904–1960)

J. H. C. Whitehead FRS
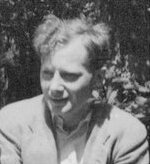
- Born: John Henry Constantine Whitehead; 11 November 1904; Madras, British India
- Died: 8 May 1960 (aged 55); Princeton, New Jersey, U.S.
- Education: Oxford University; Princeton University
- Known for: Collapse; CW complex Crossed module Simple homotopy Whitehead conjecture Whitehead group Whitehead link Whitehead manifold Whitehead problem Whitehead product Whitehead theorem Whitehead torsion Whitehead tower Whitehead's algorithm Whitehead's lemma Spanier–Whitehead duality
- Father: Henry Whitehead
- Relatives: Alfred North Whitehead (uncle)
- Awards: Senior Berwick Prize (1948); Fellow of the Royal Society
- Scientific career
- Fields: Mathematics
- Workplaces: Oxford University
- Doctoral advisor: Oswald Veblen
- Doctoral students: Ronald Brown; Graham Higman; Peter Hilton; Ioan James; Wilson Sutherland

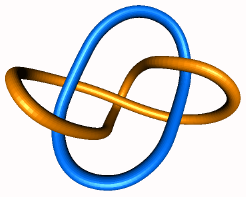
Whitehead link

John Henry Constantine Whitehead (11 November 1904 – 8 May 1960) was a British mathematician and was one of the founders of homotopy theory. He was born in Chennai (then known as Madras), in British India, and died in Princeton, New Jersey, in 1960.

== Life ==
J. H. C. (Henry) Whitehead was the son of the Right Rev. Henry Whitehead, Bishop of Madras, who had studied mathematics at Oxford, and was the nephew of Alfred North Whitehead and Isobel Duncan. He was brought up in Oxford, went to Eton and read mathematics at Balliol College, Oxford. After a year working as a stockbroker, at Buckmaster & Moore, he started a PhD in 1929 at Princeton University. His thesis, titled The representation of projective spaces, was written under the direction of Oswald Veblen in 1930. While in Princeton, he also worked with Solomon Lefschetz.

He became a fellow of Balliol in 1933. In 1934 he married the concert pianist Barbara Smyth, great-great-granddaughter of Elizabeth Fry and a cousin of Peter Pears; they had two sons. In 1936, he co-founded The Invariant Society, the student mathematics society at Oxford.

During the Second World War he worked on operations research for submarine warfare. Later, he joined the codebreakers at Bletchley Park, and by 1945 was one of some fifteen mathematicians working in the "Newmanry", a section headed by Max Newman and responsible for breaking a German teleprinter cipher using machine methods. Those methods included the Colossus machines, early digital electronic computers.

From 1947 to 1960 he was the Waynflete Professor of Pure Mathematics at Magdalen College, Oxford.

He became president of the London Mathematical Society (LMS) in 1953, a post he held until 1955. The LMS established two prizes in memory of Whitehead. The first is the annually awarded, to multiple recipients, Whitehead Prize; the second a biennially awarded Senior Whitehead Prize.

Joseph J. Rotman, in his book on algebraic topology, as a tribute to Whitehead's intellect, says, "There is a canard that every textbook of algebraic topology either ends with the definition of the Klein bottle or is a personal communication to J. H. C. Whitehead."

Whitehead died from an asymptomatic heart attack during a visit to Princeton University in May 1960.

In the late 1950s, Whitehead had approached Robert Maxwell, then chairman of Pergamon Press, to start a new journal, Topology, however Whitehead died before its first edition appeared in 1962.

== Work ==
Whitehead's definition of CW complexes gave a setting for homotopy theory that became standard. He introduced the idea of simple homotopy theory, which was later much developed in connection with algebraic K-theory. The Whitehead product is an operation in homotopy theory. The Whitehead problem on abelian groups was solved (as an independence proof) by Saharon Shelah. His involvement with topology and the Poincaré conjecture led to the creation of the Whitehead manifold. The definition of crossed modules is due to him. He also made important contributions in differential topology, particularly on triangulations and their associated smooth structures.

== Selected publications ==
- Whitehead, J. H. C. (October 1940). "On C^{1}-Complexes". The Annals of Mathematics. Second Series. 41 (4): 809–824. doi:10.2307/1968861. JSTOR 1968861.
- J. H. C. Whitehead, On incidence matrices, nuclei and homotopy types, Ann. of Math. (2) 42 (1941), 1197–1239.
- J. H. C. Whitehead, Combinatorial homotopy. I., Bull. Amer. Math. Soc. 55 (1949), 213–245
- J. H. C. Whitehead, Combinatorial homotopy. II., Bull. Amer. Math. Soc. 55 (1949), 453–496
- J. H. C. Whitehead, A certain exact sequence, Ann. of Math. (2) 52 (1950), 51–110
- J. H. C. Whitehead, Simple homotopy types, Amer. J. Math. 72 (1950), 1–57.
- Saunders MacLane, J. H. C. Whitehead, On the 3-type of a complex, Proc. Natl. Acad. Sci. USA 36 (1950), 41–48.
- Whitehead, J.H.C. (1961). "Manifolds with Transverse Fields in Euclidean Space". The Annals of Mathematics. 73 (1): 154–212. doi:10.2307/1970286. JSTOR 1970286. (published posthumously)
