= Categorification =

Connects set theory with category theory

In mathematics, categorification is the process of replacing set-theoretic theorems with category-theoretic analogues. Categorification, when done successfully, replaces sets with categories, functions with functors, and equations with natural isomorphisms of functors satisfying additional properties. The term was coined by Louis Crane.

The reverse of categorification is the process of decategorification. Decategorification is a systematic process by which isomorphic objects in a category are identified as equal. Whereas decategorification is a straightforward process, categorification is usually much less straightforward. In the representation theory of Lie algebras, modules over specific algebras are the principal objects of study, and there are several frameworks for what a categorification of such a module should be, e.g., so called (weak) abelian categorifications.

Categorification and decategorification are not precise mathematical procedures, but rather a class of possible analogues. They are used in a similar way to words like 'generalization', and not like 'sheafification'.

== Examples ==
One form of categorification takes a structure described in terms of sets, and interprets the sets as isomorphism classes of objects in a category. For example, the set of natural numbers can be seen as the set of cardinalities of finite sets (and any two sets with the same cardinality are isomorphic). In this case, operations on the set of natural numbers, such as addition and multiplication, can be seen as carrying information about coproducts and products of the category of finite sets. Less abstractly, the idea here is that manipulating sets of actual objects, and taking coproducts (combining two sets in a union) or products (building arrays of things to keep track of large numbers of them) came first. Later, the concrete structure of sets was abstracted away – taken "only up to isomorphism", to produce the abstract theory of arithmetic. This is a "decategorification" – categorification reverses this step.

Other examples include homology theories in topology. Emmy Noether gave the modern formulation of homology as the rank of certain free abelian groups by categorifying the notion of a Betti number. See also Khovanov homology as a knot invariant in knot theory.

An example in finite group theory is that the ring of symmetric functions is categorified by the category of representations of the symmetric group. The decategorification map sends the Specht module indexed by partition $\lambda$ to the Schur function indexed by the same partition,

$$S^\lambda \,\stackrel{\varphi}{\to}\; s_\lambda,$$

essentially following the character map from a favorite basis of the associated Grothendieck group to a representation-theoretic favorite basis of the ring of symmetric functions. This map reflects how the structures are similar; for example

$$\left[\operatorname{Ind}_{S_m \otimes S_n}^{S_{n+m}}(S^{\mu} \otimes S^{\nu})\right] \qquad\text{and}\qquad s_\mu s_\nu$$

have the same decomposition numbers over their respective bases, both given by Littlewood–Richardson coefficients.

== Abelian categorifications ==
For an abelian category $\mathcal{B}$, let $K(\mathcal{B})$ be the Grothendieck group of $\mathcal{B}$.

Let $A$ be a ring which is free as an abelian group, and let $\mathbf{a} = \{a_i\}_{i \in I}$ be a basis of $A$ such that the multiplication is positive in $\mathbf{a}$, i.e.

$a_i a_j = \sum_{k} c_{ij}^k a_k,$ with $c_{ij}^k \in \mathbb{Z}_{\geq 0}.$

Let $B$ be an $A$-module. Then a (weak) abelian categorification of $(A, \mathbf{a}, B)$ consists of an abelian category $\mathcal{B}$, an isomorphism $\phi: K(\mathcal{B}) \to B$, and exact endofunctors $F_i: \mathcal{B} \to \mathcal{B}$ such that

1. the functor $F_i$ lifts the action of $a_i$ on the module $B$, i.e. $\phi [F_i] = a_i \phi$, and
2. there are isomorphisms $F_i F_j \cong \bigoplus_{k} F_k^{c_{ij}^k}$, i.e. the composition $F_i F_j$ decomposes as the direct sum of functors $F_k$ in the same way that the product $a_i a_j$ decomposes as the linear combination of basis elements $a_k$.

== See also ==
- Combinatorial proof, the process of replacing number theoretic theorems by set-theoretic analogues.
- Higher category theory
- Higher-dimensional algebra
- Categorical ring
