= 2-ring =

In mathematics, a categorical ring is, roughly, a category equipped with addition and multiplication. In other words, a categorical ring is obtained by replacing the underlying set of a ring by a category. For example, given a ring R, let C be a category whose objects are the elements of the set R and whose morphisms are only the identity morphisms. Then C is a categorical ring. But the point is that one can also consider the situation in which an element of R comes with a "nontrivial automorphism".

This line of generalization of a ring eventually leads to the notion of an E_{n}-ring.

== See also ==
- Categorification
- Higher-dimensional algebra
- Lie n-algebra
