= Algebroid =

In mathematics, algebroid may refer to several distinct notions, which nevertheless all arise from generalising certain aspects of the theory of algebras or Lie algebras.

- Algebroid branch, a formal power series branch of an algebraic curve
- Algebroid cohomology
- Algebroid multifunction
- Courant algebroid, an object generalising Lie bialgebroids
- Lie algebroid, the infinitesimal counterpart of Lie groupoids
  - Atiyah algebroid, a fundamental example of a Lie algebroid associated to a principal bundle
- R-algebroid, a categorical construction associated to groupoids
