= Hurewicz theorem =

Gives a homomorphism from homotopy groups to homology groups

In mathematics, the Hurewicz theorem is a basic result of algebraic topology, connecting homotopy theory with homology theory via a map known as the Hurewicz homomorphism. The theorem is named after Witold Hurewicz, and generalizes earlier results of Henri Poincaré.

== Statement of the theorems ==
The Hurewicz theorems are a key link between homotopy groups and homology groups.

=== Absolute version ===
For any path-connected space X and strictly positive integer n there exists a group homomorphism

$$h_* \colon \pi_n(X) \to H_n(X),$$

called the Hurewicz homomorphism, from the n-th homotopy group to the n-th homology group (with integer coefficients). It is given in the following way: choose a canonical generator $u_n \in H_n(S^n)$, then a homotopy class of maps $f \in \pi_n(X)$ is taken to $f_*(u_n) \in H_n(X)$.

The Hurewicz theorem states cases in which the Hurewicz homomorphism is an isomorphism.

- For $n\ge 2$, if X is $(n-1)$-connected (that is: $\pi_i(X)= 0$ for all $i < n$), then $\tilde{H_i}(X)= 0$ for all $i < n$, and the Hurewicz map $h_* \colon \pi_n(X) \to H_n(X)$ is an isomorphism. This implies, in particular, that the homological connectivity equals the homotopical connectivity when the latter is at least 1. In addition, the Hurewicz map $h_* \colon \pi_{n+1}(X) \to H_{n+1}(X)$ is an epimorphism in this case.
- For $n=1$, the Hurewicz homomorphism induces an isomorphism $\tilde{h}_* \colon \pi_1(X)/[ \pi_1(X), \pi_1(X)] \to H_1(X)$, between the abelianization of the first homotopy group (the fundamental group) and the first homology group.

=== Relative version ===
For any pair of spaces $(X,A)$ and integer $k>1$ there exists a homomorphism

$$h_* \colon \pi_k(X,A) \to H_k(X,A)$$

from relative homotopy groups to relative homology groups. The Relative Hurewicz Theorem states that if both $X$ and $A$ are connected and the pair is $(n-1)$-connected then $H_k(X,A)=0$ for $k<n$ and $H_n(X,A)$ is obtained from $\pi_n(X,A)$ by factoring out the action of $\pi_1(A)$. This is proved in, for example, Whitehead (1978) by induction, proving in turn the absolute version and the Homotopy Addition Lemma.

This relative Hurewicz theorem is reformulated by Brown & Higgins (1981) as a statement about the morphism

$$\pi_n(X,A) \to \pi_n(X \cup CA),$$

where $CA$ denotes the cone of $A$. This statement is a special case of a homotopical excision theorem, involving induced modules for $n>2$ (crossed modules if $n=2$), which itself is deduced from a higher homotopy van Kampen theorem for relative homotopy groups, whose proof requires development of techniques of a cubical higher homotopy groupoid of a filtered space.

=== Triadic version ===
For any triad of spaces $(X;A,B)$ (i.e., a space X and subspaces A, B) and integer $k>2$ there exists a homomorphism

$$h_*\colon \pi_k(X;A,B) \to H_k(X;A,B)$$

from triad homotopy groups to triad homology groups. Note that

$$H_k(X;A,B) \cong H_k(X\cup (C(A\cup B))).$$

The Triadic Hurewicz Theorem states that if X, A, B, and $C=A\cap B$ are connected, the pairs $(A,C)$ and $(B,C)$ are $(p-1)$-connected and $(q-1)$-connected, respectively, and the triad $(X;A,B)$ is $(p+q-2)$-connected, then $H_k(X;A,B)=0$ for $k<p+q-2$ and $H_{p+q-1}(X;A)$ is obtained from $\pi_{p+q-1}(X;A,B)$ by factoring out the action of $\pi_1(A\cap B)$ and the generalised Whitehead products. The proof of this theorem uses a higher homotopy van Kampen type theorem for triadic homotopy groups, which requires a notion of the fundamental $\operatorname{cat}^n$-group of an n-cube of spaces.

=== Simplicial set version ===
The Hurewicz theorem for topological spaces can also be stated for n-connected simplicial sets satisfying the Kan condition.

=== Rational Hurewicz theorem ===
Rational Hurewicz theorem: Let X be a simply connected topological space with $\pi_i(X)\otimes \Q = 0$ for $i\leq r$. Then the Hurewicz map

$$h\otimes \Q \colon \pi_i(X)\otimes \Q \longrightarrow H_i(X;\Q )$$

induces an isomorphism for $1\leq i \leq 2r$ and a surjection for $i = 2r+1$.
