= Higher category theory =

Generalization of category theory

In mathematics, higher category theory is the part of category theory at a higher order, which means that some equalities are replaced by explicit arrows in order to be able to explicitly study the structure behind those equalities. Higher category theory is often applied in algebraic topology (especially in homotopy theory), where one studies algebraic invariants of spaces, such as the fundamental weak ∞-groupoid.

In higher category theory, the concept of higher categorical structures, such as (∞-categories), allows for a more robust treatment of homotopy theory, enabling one to capture finer homotopical distinctions, such as differentiating two topological spaces that have the same fundamental group but differ in their higher homotopy groups. This approach is particularly valuable when dealing with spaces with intricate topological features, such as the Eilenberg-MacLane space.

== Strict higher categories ==
An ordinary category has objects and morphisms, which are called 1-morphisms in the context of higher category theory. A 2-category generalizes this by also including 2-morphisms between the 1-morphisms. Continuing this up to n-morphisms between (n − 1)-morphisms gives an n-category.

Just as the category known as Cat, which is the category of small categories and functors is actually a 2-category with natural transformations as its 2-morphisms, the category n-Cat of (small) n-categories is actually an (n + 1)-category.

An n-category is defined by induction on n by:

- A 0-category is a set,
- An (n + 1)-category is a category enriched over the category n-Cat.

So a 1-category is just a (locally small) category.

The monoidal structure of Set is the one given by the cartesian product as tensor and a singleton as unit. In fact any category with finite products can be given a monoidal structure. The recursive construction of n-Cat works fine because if a category C has finite products, the category of C-enriched categories has finite products too.

While this concept is too strict for some purposes in for example, homotopy theory, where "weak" structures arise in the form of higher categories, strict cubical higher homotopy groupoids have also arisen as giving a new foundation for algebraic topology on the border between homology and homotopy theory; see the article Nonabelian algebraic topology, referenced in the book below.

== Weak higher categories ==
In weak n-categories, the associativity and identity conditions are no longer strict (that is, they are not given by equalities), but rather are satisfied up to an isomorphism of the next level. An example in topology is the composition of paths, where the identity and association conditions hold only up to reparameterization, and hence up to homotopy, which is the 2-isomorphism for this 2-category. These n-isomorphisms must well behave between hom-sets and expressing this is the difficulty in the definition of weak n-categories. Weak 2-categories, also called bicategories, were the first to be defined explicitly. A particularity of these is that a bicategory with one object is exactly a monoidal category, so that bicategories can be said to be "monoidal categories with many objects." Weak 3-categories, also called tricategories, and higher-level generalizations are increasingly harder to define explicitly. Several definitions have been given, and telling when they are equivalent, and in what sense, has become a new object of study in category theory.

== Quasi-categories ==
Weak Kan complexes, or quasi-categories, are simplicial sets satisfying a weak version of the Kan condition. André Joyal showed that they are a good foundation for higher category theory by constructing the Joyal model structure on the category of simplicial sets, whose fibrant objects are exactly quasi-categories. Recently, in 2009, the theory has been systematized further by Jacob Lurie who simply calls them infinity categories, though the latter term is also a generic term for all models of (infinity, k) categories for any k.

== Simplicially enriched categories ==
Simplicially enriched categories, or simplicial categories, are categories enriched over simplicial sets. However, when we look at them as a model for (infinity, 1)-categories, then many categorical notions (e.g., limits) do not agree with the corresponding notions in the sense of enriched categories. The same for other enriched models like topologically enriched categories.

== Topologically enriched categories ==
Topologically enriched categories (sometimes simply called topological categories) are categories enriched over some convenient category of topological spaces, e.g. the category of compactly generated Hausdorff spaces.

== Segal categories ==
These are models of higher categories introduced by Hirschowitz and Simpson in 1998, partly inspired by results of Graeme Segal in 1974.

== See also ==
- Higher-dimensional algebra
- General abstract nonsense
- Categorification
- Coherency (homotopy theory)
