= Lie n-algebra =

Generalization of a Lie algebra

In mathematics, a Lie n-algebra is a generalization of a Lie algebra, a vector space with a bracket, to higher order operations. For example, in the case of a Lie 2-algebra, the Jacobi identity is replaced by an isomorphism called a Jacobiator.

== See also ==
- 2-ring
- Homotopy Lie algebra
