= Crossed module =

In mathematics, and especially in homotopy theory, a crossed module consists of groups $G$ and $H$, where $G$ acts on $H$ by automorphisms (which we will write on the left), $(g,h) \mapsto g \cdot h$ , and a homomorphism of groups

$$d\colon H \longrightarrow G,$$

that is equivariant with respect to the conjugation action of $G$ on itself:

$$d(g \cdot h) = gd(h)g^{-1}$$

and also satisfies the so-called Peiffer identity:

$$d(h_{1}) \cdot h_{2} = h_{1}h_{2}h_{1}^{-1}$$

== Origin ==
The first mention of the second identity for a crossed module seems to be in footnote 25 on p. 422 of J. H. C. Whitehead's 1941 paper cited below, while the term 'crossed module' is introduced in his 1946 paper cited below. These ideas were well worked up in his 1949 paper 'Combinatorial homotopy II', which also introduced the important idea of a free crossed module. Whitehead's ideas on crossed modules and their applications are developed and explained in the book by Brown, Higgins, Sivera listed below. Some generalisations of the idea of crossed module are explained in the paper of Janelidze.

== Examples ==
Let $N$ be a normal subgroup of a group $G$. Then, the inclusion

$$d\colon N \longrightarrow G$$

is a crossed module with the conjugation action of $G$ on $N$.

For any group G, modules over the group ring are crossed G-modules with d = 0.

For any group H, the homomorphism from H to Aut(H) sending any element of H to the corresponding inner automorphism is a crossed module.

Given any central extension of groups

$$1 \to A \to H \to G \to 1 \!$$

the surjective homomorphism

$$d\colon H \to G \!$$

together with the action of $G$ on $H$ defines a crossed module. Thus, central extensions can be seen as special crossed modules. Conversely, a crossed module with surjective boundary defines a central extension.

If (X,A,x) is a pointed pair of topological spaces (i.e. $A$ is a subspace of $X$, and $x$ is a point in $A$), then the homotopy boundary

$$d\colon \pi_{2}(X,A,x) \rightarrow \pi_{1}(A,x) \!$$

from the second relative homotopy group to the fundamental group, may be given the structure of crossed module. The functor

$$\Pi \colon (\text{pairs of pointed spaces}) \rightarrow (\text{crossed modules})$$

satisfies a form of the van Kampen theorem, in that it preserves certain colimits.

The result on the crossed module of a pair can also be phrased as: if

$$F \rightarrow E \rightarrow B \!$$

is a pointed fibration of spaces, then the induced map of fundamental groups

$$d\colon \pi_{1}(F) \rightarrow \pi_{1}(E) \!$$

may be given the structure of crossed module. This example is useful in algebraic K-theory. There are higher-dimensional versions of this fact using n-cubes of spaces.

These examples suggest that crossed modules may be thought of as "2-dimensional groups". In fact, this idea can be made precise using category theory. It can be shown that a crossed module is essentially the same as a categorical group or 2-group: that is, a group object in the category of categories, or equivalently a category object in the category of groups. This means that the concept of crossed module is one version of the result of blending the concepts of "group" and "category". This equivalence is important for higher-dimensional versions of groups.

== Classifying space ==
Any crossed module

$$M= (d\colon H \longrightarrow G) \!$$

has a classifying space BM with the property that its homotopy groups are Coker d, in dimension 1, Ker d in dimension 2, and 0 in dimensions above 2. It is possible to describe the homotopy classes of maps from a CW-complex to BM. This allows one to prove that (pointed, weak) homotopy 2-types are completely described by crossed modules.
