= Timeline of category theory and related mathematics =

History of maths

This is a timeline of category theory and related mathematics. Its scope ("related mathematics") is taken as:

- Categories of abstract algebraic structures including representation theory and universal algebra;
- Homological algebra;
- Homotopical algebra;
- Topology using categories, including algebraic topology, categorical topology, quantum topology, low-dimensional topology;
- Categorical logic and set theory in the categorical context such as algebraic set theory;
- Foundations of mathematics building on categories, for instance topos theory;
- Abstract geometry, including algebraic geometry, categorical noncommutative geometry, etc.
- Quantization related to category theory, in particular categorical quantization;
- Categorical physics relevant for mathematics.

In this article, and in category theory in general, ∞ = ω.

== Timeline to 1945: before the definitions ==
Year	Contributors	Event
1890	David Hilbert	Resolution of modules and free resolution of modules.
1890	David Hilbert	Hilbert's syzygy theorem is a prototype for a concept of dimension in homological algebra.
1893	David Hilbert	A fundamental theorem in algebraic geometry, the Hilbert Nullstellensatz. It was later reformulated to: the category of affine varieties over a field k is equivalent to the dual of the category of reduced finitely generated (commutative) k-algebras.
1894	Henri Poincaré	Fundamental group of a topological space.
1895	Henri Poincaré	Simplicial homology.
1895	Henri Poincaré	Fundamental work Analysis situs, the beginning of algebraic topology.
c.1910	L. E. J. Brouwer	Brouwer develops intuitionism as a contribution to foundational debate in the period roughly 1910 to 1930 on mathematics, with intuitionistic logic a by-product of an increasingly sterile discussion on formalism.
1923	Hermann Künneth	Künneth formula for homology of product of spaces.
1926	Heinrich Brandt	Defines the notion of groupoid.
1928	Arend Heyting	Brouwer's intuitionistic logic made into formal mathematics, as logic in which the Heyting algebra replaces the Boolean algebra.
1929	Walther Mayer	Chain complexes.
1930	Ernst Zermelo–Abraham Fraenkel	Statement of the definitive ZF-axioms of set theory, first stated in 1908 and improved upon since then.
c.1930	Emmy Noether	Module theory is developed by Noether and her students, and algebraic topology starts to be properly founded in abstract algebra rather than by ad hoc arguments.
1932	Eduard Čech	Čech cohomology, homotopy groups of a topological space.
1933	Solomon Lefschetz	Singular homology of topological spaces.
1934	Reinhold Baer	Ext groups, Ext functor (for abelian groups and with different notation).
1935	Witold Hurewicz	Higher homotopy groups of a topological space.
1936	Marshall Stone	Stone representation theorem for Boolean algebras initiates various Stone dualities.
1937	Richard Brauer–Cecil Nesbitt	Frobenius algebras.
1938	Hassler Whitney	"Modern" definition of cohomology, summarizing the work since James Alexander and Andrey Kolmogorov first defined cochains.
1940	Reinhold Baer	Injective modules.
1940	Kurt Gödel–Paul Bernays	Proper classes in set theory.
1940	Heinz Hopf	Hopf algebras.
1941	Witold Hurewicz	First fundamental theorem of homological algebra: Given a short exact sequence of spaces there exist a connecting homomorphism such that the long sequence of cohomology groups of the spaces is exact.
1942	Samuel Eilenberg–Saunders Mac Lane	Universal coefficient theorem for Čech cohomology; later this became the general universal coefficient theorem. The notations Hom and Ext first appear in their paper.
1943	Norman Steenrod	Homology with local coefficients.
1943	Israel Gelfand–Mark Naimark	Gelfand–Naimark theorem (sometimes called Gelfand isomorphism theorem): The category Haus of locally compact Hausdorff spaces with continuous proper maps as morphisms is equivalent to the category C*Alg of commutative C*-algebras with proper *-homomorphisms as morphisms.
1944	Garrett Birkhoff–Øystein Ore	Galois connections generalizing the Galois correspondence: a pair of adjoint functors between two categories that arise from partially ordered sets (in modern formulation).
1944	Samuel Eilenberg	"Modern" definition of singular homology and singular cohomology.
1945	Beno Eckmann	Defines the cohomology ring building on Heinz Hopf's work.

== 1945–1970 ==
Year	Contributors	Event
1945	Saunders Mac Lane–Samuel Eilenberg	Start of category theory: axioms for categories, functors and natural transformations.
1945	Norman Steenrod–Samuel Eilenberg	Eilenberg–Steenrod axioms for homology and cohomology.
1945	Jean Leray	Starts sheaf theory: At this time a sheaf was a map that assigned a module or a ring to a closed subspace of a topological space. The first example was the sheaf assigning to a closed subspace its p-th cohomology group.
1945	Jean Leray	Defines Sheaf cohomology using his new concept of sheaf.
1946	Jean Leray	Invents spectral sequences as a method for iteratively approximating cohomology groups by previous approximate cohomology groups. In the limiting case it gives the sought cohomology groups.
1948	Cartan seminar	Writes up sheaf theory for the first time.
1948	A. L. Blakers	Crossed complexes (called group systems by Blakers), after a suggestion of Samuel Eilenberg: A nonabelian generalization of chain complexes of abelian groups which are equivalent to strict ω-groupoids. They form a category Crs that has many satisfactory properties such as a monoidal structure.
1949	John Henry Whitehead	Crossed modules.
1949	André Weil	Formulates the Weil conjectures on remarkable relations between the cohomological structure of algebraic varieties over C and the diophantine structure of algebraic varieties over finite fields.
1950	Henri Cartan	In the book Sheaf theory from the Cartan seminar he defines: Sheaf space (étale space), support of sheaves axiomatically, sheaf cohomology with support in an axiomatic form and more.
1950	John Henry Whitehead	Outlines algebraic homotopy program for describing, understanding and calculating homotopy types of spaces and homotopy classes of mappings
1950	Samuel Eilenberg–Joe Zilber	Simplicial sets as a purely algebraic model of well behaved topological spaces. A simplicial set can also be seen as a presheaf on the simplex category. A category is a simplicial set such that the Segal maps are isomorphisms.
1951	Henri Cartan	Modern definition of sheaf theory in which a sheaf is defined using open subsets instead of closed subsets of a topological space and all the open subsets are treated at once. A sheaf on a topological space X becomes a functor resembling a function defined locally on X, and taking values in sets, abelian groups, commutative rings, modules or generally in any category C. In fact Alexander Grothendieck later made a dictionary between sheaves and functions. Another interpretation of sheaves is as continuously varying sets (a generalization of abstract sets). Its purpose is to provide a unified approach to connect local and global properties of topological spaces and to classify the obstructions for passing from local objects to global objects on a topological space by pasting together the local pieces. The C-valued sheaves on a topological space and their homomorphisms form a category.
1952	William Massey	Invents exact couples for calculating spectral sequences.
1953	Jean-Pierre Serre	Serre C-theory and Serre subcategories.
1952	Nobuo Yoneda	Yoneda publishes his famous lemma. Yoneda's Lemma allows one to consider objects in a (small) category as a presheaves. Yoneda lemma plays a critical role in the study of representable functors in algebraic geometry. For example, even though it is never mentioned explicitly, it is central to the ideas of Grothendieck's "Fondements de la Géométrie Algébrique".
1955	Jean-Pierre Serre	Shows there is a 1−1 correspondence between algebraic vector bundles over an affine variety and finitely generated projective modules over its coordinate ring (Serre–Swan theorem).
1955	Jean-Pierre Serre	Coherent sheaf cohomology in algebraic geometry.
1956	Jean-Pierre Serre	GAGA correspondence.
1956	Henri Cartan–Samuel Eilenberg	Influential book: Homological Algebra, summarizing the state of the art in its topic at that time. The notation Tor_{n} and Ext^{n}, as well as the concepts of projective module, projective and injective resolution of a module, derived functor and hyperhomology appear in this book for the first time.
1956	Daniel Kan	Simplicial homotopy theory also called categorical homotopy theory: A homotopy theory completely internal to the category of simplicial sets.
1957	Charles Ehresmann–Jean Bénabou	Pointless topology building on Marshall Stone's work.
1957	Alexander Grothendieck	Abelian categories in homological algebra that combine exactness and linearity.
1957	Alexander Grothendieck	Influential Tohoku paper rewrites homological algebra; proving Grothendieck duality (Serre duality for possibly singular algebraic varieties). He also showed that the conceptual basis for homological algebra over a ring also holds for linear objects varying as sheaves over a space.
1957	Alexander Grothendieck	Grothendieck's relative point of view, S-schemes.
1957	Alexander Grothendieck	Grothendieck–Hirzebruch–Riemann–Roch theorem for smooth schemes; the proof introduces K-theory.
1957	Daniel Kan	Kan complexes: Simplicial sets (in which every horn has a filler) that are geometric models of simplicial ∞-groupoids. Kan complexes are also the fibrant (and cofibrant) objects of model categories of simplicial sets for which the fibrations are Kan fibrations.
1958	Alexander Grothendieck	Starts new foundation of algebraic geometry by generalizing varieties and other spaces in algebraic geometry to schemes which have the structure of a category with open subsets as objects and restrictions as morphisms. Schemes form a category that is a Grothendieck topos, and to a scheme and even a stack one may associate a Zariski topos, an étale topos, a fppf topos, a fpqc topos, a Nisnevich topos, a flat topos, ... depending on the topology imposed on the scheme. The whole of algebraic geometry was categorized with time.
1958	Roger Godement	Monads in category theory (then called standard constructions and triples). Monads generalize classical notions from universal algebra and can in this sense be thought of as an algebraic theory over a category: the theory of the category of T-algebras. An algebra for a monad subsumes and generalizes the notion of a model for an algebraic theory.
1958	Daniel Kan	Daniel Kan introduces Adjoint functors. They are critical, for example, in the theory of sheaves.
1958	Daniel Kan	Limits in category theory.
1958	Alexander Grothendieck	Fibred categories.
1959	Bernard Dwork	Proves the rationality part of the Weil conjectures (the first conjecture).
1959	Jean-Pierre Serre	Algebraic K-theory launched by explicit analogy of ring theory with geometric cases.
1960	Alexander Grothendieck	Fiber functors
1960	Daniel Kan	Kan extensions
1960	Alexander Grothendieck	Formal algebraic geometry and formal schemes
1960	Alexander Grothendieck	Representable functors
1960	Alexander Grothendieck	Categorizes Galois theory (Grothendieck's Galois theory)
1960	Alexander Grothendieck	Descent theory: An idea extending the notion of gluing in topology to schemes to get around the brute equivalence relations. It also generalizes localization in topology
1961	Alexander Grothendieck	Local cohomology. Introduced at a seminar in 1961 but the notes are published in 1967
1961	Jim Stasheff	Associahedra later used in the definition of weak n-categories
1961	Richard Swan	Shows there is a 1−1 correspondence between topological vector bundles over a compact Hausdorff space X and finitely generated projective modules over the ring C(X) of continuous functions on X (Serre–Swan theorem)
1963	Frank Adams–Saunders Mac Lane	PROP categories and PACT categories for higher homotopies. PROPs are categories for describing families of operations with any number of inputs and outputs. Operads are special PROPs with operations with only one output
1963	Alexander Grothendieck	Étale topology, a special Grothendieck topology on schemes
1963	Alexander Grothendieck	Étale cohomology
1963	Alexander Grothendieck	Grothendieck toposes, which are categories which are like universes (generalized spaces) of sets in which one can do mathematics
1963	William Lawvere	Algebraic theories and algebraic categories
1963	William Lawvere	Founds categorical logic, discovers internal logics of categories and recognizes its importance and introduces Lawvere theories. Essentially categorical logic is a lift of different logics to being internal logics of categories. Each kind of category with extra structure corresponds to a system of logic with its own inference rules. A Lawvere theory is an algebraic theory as a category with finite products and possessing a "generic algebra" (a generic group). The structures described by a Lawvere theory are models of the Lawvere theory
1963	Jean-Louis Verdier	Triangulated categories and triangulated functors. Derived categories and derived functors are special cases of these
1963	Jim Stasheff	A_{∞}-algebras: dg-algebra analogs of topological monoids associative up to homotopy appearing in topology (i.e. H-spaces)
1963	Jean Giraud	Giraud characterization theorem characterizing Grothendieck toposes as categories of sheaves over a small site
1963	Charles Ehresmann	Internal category theory: Internalization of categories in a category V with pullbacks is replacing the category Set (same for classes instead of sets) by V in the definition of a category. Internalization is a way to rise the categorical dimension
1963	Charles Ehresmann	Multiple categories and multiple functors
1963	Saunders Mac Lane	Monoidal categories, also called tensor categories: Strict 2-categories with one object made by a relabelling trick to categories with a tensor product of objects that is secretly the composition of morphisms in the 2-category. There are several object in a monoidal category since the relabelling trick makes 2-morphisms of the 2-category to morphisms, morphisms of the 2-category to objects and forgets about the single object. In general a higher relabelling trick works for n-categories with one object to make general monoidal categories. The most common examples include: ribbon categories, braided tensor categories, spherical categories, compact closed categories, symmetric tensor categories, modular categories, autonomous categories, categories with duality
1963	Saunders Mac Lane	Mac Lane coherence theorem for determining commutativity of diagrams in monoidal categories
1964	William Lawvere	ETCS Elementary Theory of the Category of Sets: An axiomatization of the category of sets which is also the constant case of an elementary topos
1964	Barry Mitchell–Peter Freyd	Mitchell–Freyd embedding theorem: Every small abelian category admits an exact and full embedding into the category of (left) modules Mod_{R} over some ring R
1964	Rudolf Haag–Daniel Kastler	Algebraic quantum field theory after ideas of Irving Segal
1964	Alexander Grothendieck	Topologizes categories axiomatically by imposing a Grothendieck topology on categories which are then called sites. The purpose of sites is to define coverings on them so sheaves over sites can be defined. The other "spaces" one can define sheaves for except topological spaces are locales
1964	Michael Artin–Alexander Grothendieck	ℓ-adic cohomology, technical development in SGA4 of the long-anticipated Weil cohomology.
1964	Alexander Grothendieck	Proves the Weil conjectures except the analogue of the Riemann hypothesis
1964	Alexander Grothendieck	Six operations formalism in homological algebra; Rf_{*}, f^{−1}, Rf_{!}, f^{!}, ⊗^{L}, RHom, and proof of its closedness
1964	Alexander Grothendieck	Introduced in a letter to Jean-Pierre Serre conjectural motives to express the idea that there is a single universal cohomology theory underlying the various cohomology theories for algebraic varieties. According to Grothendieck's philosophy there should be a universal cohomology functor attaching a pure motive h(X) to each smooth projective variety X. When X is not smooth or projective h(X) must be replaced by a more general mixed motive which has a weight filtration whose quotients are pure motives. The category of motives (the categorical framework for the universal cohomology theory) may be used as an abstract substitute for singular cohomology (and rational cohomology) to compare, relate and unite "motivated" properties and parallel phenomena of the various cohomology theories and to detect topological structure of algebraic varieties. The categories of pure motives and of mixed motives are abelian tensor categories and the category of pure motives is also a Tannakian category. Categories of motives are made by replacing the category of varieties by a category with the same objects but whose morphisms are correspondences, modulo a suitable equivalence relation; different equivalences give different theories. Rational equivalence gives the category of Chow motives with Chow groups as morphisms which are in some sense universal. Every geometric cohomology theory is a functor on the category of motives. Each induced functor ρ:motives modulo numerical equivalence→graded Q-vector spaces is called a realization of the category of motives, the inverse functors are called improvements. Mixed motives explain phenomena in as diverse areas as: Hodge theory, algebraic K-theory, polylogarithms, regulator maps, automorphic forms, L-functions, ℓ-adic representations, trigonometric sums, homotopy of algebraic varieties, algebraic cycles, moduli spaces and thus has the potential of enriching each area and of unifying them all.
1965	Edgar Brown	Abstract homotopy categories: A proper framework for the study of homotopy theory of CW complexes
1965	Max Kelly	dg-categories
1965	Max Kelly–Samuel Eilenberg	Enriched category theory: Categories C enriched over a category V are categories with Hom-sets Hom_{C} not just a set or class but with the structure of objects in the category V. Enrichment over V is a way to rise the categorical dimension
1965	Charles Ehresmann	Defines both strict 2-categories and strict n-categories
1966	Alexander Grothendieck	Crystals (a kind of sheaf used in crystalline cohomology)
1966	William Lawvere	ETAC Elementary theory of abstract categories, first proposed axioms for Cat or category theory using first-order logic
1967	Jean Bénabou	Bicategories (weak 2-categories) and weak 2-functors
1967	William Lawvere	Founds synthetic differential geometry
1967	Simon Kochen–Ernst Specker	Kochen–Specker theorem in quantum mechanics
1967	Jean-Louis Verdier	Defines derived categories and redefines derived functors in terms of derived categories
1967	Peter Gabriel–Michel Zisman	Axiomatizes simplicial homotopy theory
1967	Daniel Quillen	Quillen model categories and Quillen model functors: A framework for doing homotopy theory in an axiomatic way in categories and an abstraction of homotopy categories in such a way that hC = C[W^{−1}] where W^{−1} are the inverted weak equivalences of the Quillen model category C. Quillen model categories are homotopically complete and cocomplete, and come with a built-in Eckmann–Hilton duality
1967	Daniel Quillen	Homotopical algebra (published as a book and also sometimes called noncommutative homological algebra): The study of various model categories and the interplay between fibrations, cofibrations and weak equivalences in arbitrary closed model categories
1967	Daniel Quillen	Quillen axioms for homotopy theory in model categories
1967	Daniel Quillen	First fundamental theorem of simplicial homotopy theory: The category of simplicial sets is a (proper) closed (simplicial) model category
1967	Daniel Quillen	Second fundamental theorem of simplicial homotopy theory: The realization functor and the singular functor is an equivalence of categories hΔ and hTop (Δ the category of simplicial sets)
1967	Jean Bénabou	V-categories: A category C with an action ⊗ :V × C → C which is associative and unital up to coherent isomorphism, for V a symmetric monoidal category. V-categories can be seen as the categorification of R-modules over a commutative ring R
1968	Chen-Ning Yang-Rodney Baxter	Yang–Baxter equation, later used as a relation in braided monoidal categories for crossings of braids
1968	Alexander Grothendieck	Crystalline cohomology: A p-adic cohomology theory in characteristic p invented to fill the gap left by étale cohomology which is deficient in using mod p coefficients for this case. It is sometimes referred to by Grothendieck as the yoga of de Rham coefficients and Hodge coefficients since crystalline cohomology of a variety X in characteristic p is like de Rham cohomology mod p of X and there is an isomorphism between de Rham cohomology groups and Hodge cohomology groups of harmonic forms
1968	Alexander Grothendieck	Grothendieck connection
1968	Alexander Grothendieck	Formulates the standard conjectures on algebraic cycles
1968	Michael Artin	Algebraic spaces in algebraic geometry as a generalization of schemes
1968	Charles Ehresmann	Sketches: An alternative way of presenting a theory (which is categorical in character as opposed to linguistic) whose models are to study in appropriate categories. A sketch is a small category with a set of distinguished cones and a set of distinguished cocones satisfying some axioms. A model of a sketch is a set-valued functor transforming the distinguished cones into limit cones and the distinguished cocones into colimit cones. The categories of models of sketches are exactly the accessible categories
1968	Joachim Lambek	Multicategories
1968-1972	Michael Boardman and Rainer Vogt (1968), Peter May (1972)	Operads: An abstraction of the family of composable functions of several variables together with an action of permutation of variables. Operads can be seen as algebraic theories and algebras over operads are then models of the theories. Each operad gives a monad on Top. Multicategories with one object are operads. PROPs generalize operads to admit operations with several inputs and several outputs. Operads are used in defining opetopes, higher category theory, homotopy theory, homological algebra, algebraic geometry, string theory and many other areas.
1969	Max Kelly-Nobuo Yoneda	Ends and coends
1969	Pierre Deligne-David Mumford	Deligne–Mumford stacks as a generalization of schemes
1969	William Lawvere	Doctrines (category theory), a doctrine is a monad on a 2-category
1970	William Lawvere-Myles Tierney	Elementary topoi: Categories modeled after the category of sets which are like universes (generalized spaces) of sets in which one can do mathematics. One of many ways to define a topos is: a properly cartesian closed category with a subobject classifier. Every Grothendieck topos is an elementary topos
1970	John Conway	Skein theory of knots: The computation of knot invariants by skein modules. Skein modules can be based on quantum invariants

== 1971–1980 ==
Year	Contributors	Event
1971	Saunders Mac Lane	Influential book: Categories for the Working Mathematician, which became the standard reference in category theory
1971	Horst Herrlich–Oswald Wyler	Categorical topology: The study of topological categories of structured sets (generalizations of topological spaces, uniform spaces and the various other spaces in topology) and relations between them, culminating in universal topology. General categorical topology study and uses structured sets in a topological category as general topology study and uses topological spaces. Algebraic categorical topology tries to apply the machinery of algebraic topology for topological spaces to structured sets in a topological category.
1971	Harold Temperley–Elliott Lieb	Temperley–Lieb algebras: Algebras of tangles defined by generators of tangles and relations among them
1971	William Lawvere–Myles Tierney	Lawvere–Tierney topology on a topos
1971	William Lawvere–Myles Tierney	Topos theoretic forcing (forcing in toposes): Categorization of the set theoretic forcing method to toposes for attempts to prove or disprove the continuum hypothesis, independence of the axiom of choice, etc. in toposes
1971	Bob Walters–Ross Street	Yoneda structures on 2-categories
1971	Roger Penrose	String diagrams to manipulate morphisms in a monoidal category
1971	Jean Giraud	Gerbes: Categorified principal bundles that are also special cases of stacks
1971	Joachim Lambek	Generalizes the Haskell–Curry–William–Howard correspondence to a three way isomorphism between types, propositions and objects of a cartesian closed category
1972	Max Kelly	Clubs (category theory) and coherence (category theory). A club is a special kind of 2-dimensional theory or a monoid in Cat/(category of finite sets and permutations P), each club giving a 2-monad on Cat
1972	John Isbell	Locales: A "generalized topological space" or "pointless spaces" defined by a lattice (a complete Heyting algebra also called a Brouwer lattice) just as for a topological space the open subsets form a lattice. If the lattice possess enough points it is a topological space. Locales are the main objects of pointless topology, the dual objects being frames. Both locales and frames form categories that are each other's opposite. Sheaves can be defined over locales. The other "spaces" one can define sheaves over are sites. Although locales were known earlier John Isbell first named them
1972	Ross Street	Formal theory of monads: The theory of monads in 2-categories
1972	Peter Freyd	Fundamental theorem of topos theory: Every slice category (E,Y) of a topos E is a topos and the functor f*: (E,X) → (E,Y) preserves exponentials and the subobject classifier object Ω and has a right and left adjoint functor
1972	Alexander Grothendieck	Grothendieck universes for sets as part of foundations for categories
1972	Jean Bénabou–Ross Street	Cosmoses which categorize universes: A cosmos is a generalized universe of 1-categories in which you can do category theory. When set theory is generalized to the study of a Grothendieck topos, the analogous generalization of category theory is the study of a cosmos.: 1. Ross Street definition: A bicategory such that 2. small bicoproducts exist; 3. each monad admits a Kleisli construction (analogous to the quotient of an equivalence relation in a topos); 4. it is locally small-cocomplete; and 5. there exists a small Cauchy generator.; Cosmoses are closed under dualization, parametrization and localization. Ross Street also introduces elementary cosmoses. Jean Bénabou definition: A bicomplete symmetric monoidal closed category
1972	William Mitchell–Jean Bénabou	Mitchell–Bénabou internal language of a toposes: For a topos E with subobject classifier object Ω a language (or type theory) L(E) where: 1. the types are the objects of E 2. terms of type X in the variables x_{i} of type X_{i} are polynomial expressions φ(x_{1},...,x_{m}): 1→X in the arrows x_{i}: 1→X_{i} in E 3. formulas are terms of type Ω (arrows from types to Ω); 4. connectives are induced from the internal Heyting algebra structure of Ω 5. quantifiers bounded by types and applied to formulas are also treated 6. for each type X there are also two binary relations =_{X} (defined applying the diagonal map to the product term of the arguments) and ∈_{X} (defined applying the evaluation map to the product of the term and the power term of the arguments).; A formula is true if the arrow which interprets it factor through the arrow true:1→Ω. The Mitchell-Bénabou internal language is a powerful way to describe various objects in a topos as if they were sets and hence is a way of making the topos into a generalized set theory, to write and prove statements in a topos using first order intuitionistic predicate logic, to consider toposes as type theories and to express properties of a topos. Any language L also generates a linguistic topos E(L)
1973	Chris Reedy	Reedy categories: Categories of "shapes" that can be used to do homotopy theory. A Reedy category is a category R equipped with a structure enabling the inductive construction of diagrams and natural transformations of shape R. The most important consequence of a Reedy structure on R is the existence of a model structure on the functor category M^{R} whenever M is a model category. Another advantage of the Reedy structure is that its cofibrations, fibrations and factorizations are explicit. In a Reedy category there is a notion of an injective and a surjective morphism such that any morphism can be factored uniquely as a surjection followed by an injection. Examples are the ordinal α considered as a poset and hence a category. The opposite R° of a Reedy category R is also a Reedy category. The simplex category Δ and more generally for any simplicial set X its category of simplices Δ/X is a Reedy category. The model structure on M^{Δ} for a model category M is described in an unpublished manuscript by Chris Reedy
1973	Kenneth Brown–Stephen Gersten	Shows the existence of a global closed model structure on the category of simplicial sheaves on a topological space, with weak assumptions on the topological space
1973	Kenneth Brown	Generalized sheaf cohomology of a topological space X with coefficients a sheaf on X with values in Kans category of spectra with some finiteness conditions. It generalizes generalized cohomology theory and sheaf cohomology with coefficients in a complex of abelian sheaves
1973	William Lawvere	Finds that Cauchy completeness can be expressed for general enriched categories with the category of generalized metric spaces as a special case. Cauchy sequences become left adjoint modules and convergence become representability
1973	Jean Bénabou	Distributors (also called modules, profunctors, directed bridges)
1973	Pierre Deligne	Proves the last of the Weil conjectures, the analogue of the Riemann hypothesis
1973	Michael Boardman–Rainer Vogt	Segal categories: Simplicial analogues of A_{∞}-categories. They naturally generalize simplicial categories, in that they can be regarded as simplicial categories with composition only given up to homotopy. Def: A simplicial space X such that X_{0} (the set of points) is a discrete simplicial set and the Segal map φ_{k} : X_{k} → X_{1} × _{X_{0}} ... × _{X_{0}} X_{1} (induced by X(α_{i}): X_{k} → X_{1}) assigned to X is a weak equivalence of simplicial sets for k ≥ 2. Segal categories are a weak form of S-categories, in which composition is only defined up to a coherent system of equivalences. Segal categories were defined one year later implicitly by Graeme Segal. They were named Segal categories first by William Dwyer–Daniel Kan–Jeffrey Smith 1989. In their famous book Homotopy invariant algebraic structures on topological spaces, J. Michael Boardman and Rainer Vogt called them quasi-categories. A quasi-category is a simplicial set satisfying the weak Kan condition, so quasi-categories are also called weak Kan complexes
1973	Daniel Quillen	Frobenius categories: An exact category in which the classes of injective and projective objects coincide and for all objects x in the category there is a deflation P(x)→x (the projective cover of x) and an inflation x→I(x) (the injective hull of x) such that both P(x) and I(x) are in the category of pro/injective objects. A Frobenius category E is an example of a model category and the quotient E/P (P is the class of projective/injective objects) is its homotopy category hE
1974	Michael Artin	Generalizes Deligne–Mumford stacks to Artin stacks
1974	Robert Paré	Paré monadicity theorem: E is a topos → E° is monadic over E
1974	Andy Magid	Generalizes Grothendieck's Galois theory from groups to the case of rings using Galois groupoids
1974	Jean Bénabou	Logic of fibred categories
1974	John Gray	Gray categories with Gray tensor product
1974	John Gray	"Formal category theory: adjointness for 2-categories" book, where the field of formal category theory is initiated.
1974	Kenneth Brown	Writes a very influential paper that defines Browns categories of fibrant objects and dually Brown categories of cofibrant objects
1974	Shiing-Shen Chern–James Simons	Chern–Simons theory: A particular TQFT which describe knot and manifold invariants, at that time only in 3D
1975	Saul Kripke–André Joyal	Kripke–Joyal semantics of the Mitchell–Bénabou internal language for toposes: The logic in categories of sheaves is first-order intuitionistic predicate logic
1975	Radu Diaconescu	Diaconescu theorem: The internal axiom of choice holds in a topos → the topos is a boolean topos. So in IZF the axiom of choice implies the law of excluded middle
1975	Manfred Szabo	Polycategories
1975	William Lawvere	Observes that Deligne's theorem about enough points in a coherent topos implies the Gödel completeness theorem for first-order logic in that topos
1976	Alexander Grothendieck	Schematic homotopy types
1976	Marcel Crabbe	Heyting categories also called logoses: Regular categories in which the subobjects of an object form a lattice, and in which each inverse image map has a right adjoint. More precisely a coherent category C such that for all morphisms f:A→B in C the functor f*:Sub_{C}(B)→Sub_{C}(A) has a left adjoint and a right adjoint. Sub_{C}(A) is the preorder of subobjects of A (the full subcategory of C/A whose objects are subobjects of A) in C. Every topos is a logos. Heyting categories generalize Heyting algebras.
1976	Ross Street	Computads
1977	Michael Makkai–Gonzalo Reyes	Develops the Mitchell–Bénabou internal language of a topos thoroughly in a more general setting
1977	Andre Boileau–André Joyal–John Zangwill	LST, local set theory: Local set theory is a typed set theory whose underlying logic is higher-order intuitionistic logic. It is a generalization of classical set theory, in which sets are replaced by terms of certain types. The category C(S) built out of a local theory S whose objects are the local sets (or S-sets) and whose arrows are the local maps (or S-maps) is a linguistic topos. Every topos E is equivalent to a linguistic topos C(S(E))
1977	John Roberts	Introduces most general nonabelian cohomology of ω-categories with ω-categories as coefficients when he realized that general cohomology is about coloring simplices in ω-categories. There are two methods of constructing general nonabelian cohomology, as nonabelian sheaf cohomology in terms of descent for ω-category valued sheaves, and in terms of homotopical cohomology theory which realizes the cocycles. The two approaches are related by codescent
1978	John Roberts	Complicial sets (simplicial sets with structure or enchantment)
1978	Francois Bayen–Moshe Flato–Chris Fronsdal–André Lichnerowicz–Daniel Sternheimer	Deformation quantization, later to be a part of categorical quantization
1978	André Joyal	Combinatorial species in enumerative combinatorics
1978	Don Anderson	Building on work of Kenneth Brown defines ABC (co)fibration categories for doing homotopy theory and more general ABC model categories, but the theory lies dormant until 2003. Every Quillen model category is an ABC model category. A difference to Quillen model categories is that in ABC model categories fibrations and cofibrations are independent and that for an ABC model category M^{D} is an ABC model category. To an ABC (co)fibration category is canonically associated a (left) right Heller derivator. Topological spaces with homotopy equivalences as weak equivalences, Hurewicz cofibrations as cofibrations and Hurewicz fibrations as fibrations form an ABC model category, the Hurewicz model structure on Top. Complexes of objects in an abelian category with quasi-isomorphisms as weak equivalences and monomorphisms as cofibrations form an ABC precofibration category
1979	Don Anderson	Anderson axioms for homotopy theory in categories with a fraction functor
1980	Alexander Zamolodchikov	Zamolodchikov equation also called tetrahedron equation
1980	Ross Street	Bicategorical Yoneda lemma
1980	Masaki Kashiwara–Zoghman Mebkhout	Proves the Riemann–Hilbert correspondence for complex manifolds
1980	Peter Freyd	Numerals in a topos

== 1981–1990 ==
Year	Contributors	Event
1981	Shigeru Mukai	Mukai–Fourier transform
1982	Bob Walters	Enriched categories with bicategories as a base
1983	Alexander Grothendieck	Pursuing stacks: Manuscript circulated from Bangor, written in English in response to a correspondence in English with Ronald Brown and Tim Porter, starting with a letter addressed to Daniel Quillen, developing mathematical visions in a 629 pages manuscript, a kind of diary, and to be published by the Société Mathématique de France, edited by G. Maltsiniotis.
1983	Alexander Grothendieck	First appearance of strict ∞-categories in pursuing stacks, following a 1981 published definition by Ronald Brown and Philip J. Higgins.
1983	Alexander Grothendieck	Fundamental infinity groupoid: A complete homotopy invariant Π_{∞}(X) for CW-complexes X. The inverse functor is the geometric realization functor | . | and together they form an "equivalence" between the category of CW-complexes and the category of ω-groupoids
1983	Alexander Grothendieck	Homotopy hypothesis: The homotopy category of CW-complexes is Quillen equivalent to a homotopy category of reasonable weak ∞-groupoids
1983	Alexander Grothendieck	Grothendieck derivators: A model for homotopy theory similar to Quilen model categories but more satisfactory. Grothendieck derivators are dual to Heller derivators
1983	Alexander Grothendieck	Elementary modelizers: Categories of presheaves that modelize homotopy types (thus generalizing the theory of simplicial sets). Canonical modelizers are also used in pursuing stacks
1983	Alexander Grothendieck	Smooth functors and proper functors
1984	Vladimir Bazhanov–Razumov Stroganov	Bazhanov–Stroganov d-simplex equation generalizing the Yang–Baxter equation and the Zamolodchikov equation
1984	Horst Herrlich	Universal topology in categorical topology: A unifying categorical approach to the different structured sets (topological structures such as topological spaces and uniform spaces) whose class form a topological category similar as universal algebra is for algebraic structures
1984	André Joyal	Simplicial sheaves (sheaves with values in simplicial sets). Simplicial sheaves on a topological space X is a model for the hypercomplete ∞-topos Sh(X)^{^}
1984	André Joyal	Shows that the category of simplicial objects in a Grothendieck topos has a closed model structure
1984	André Joyal–Myles Tierney	Main Galois theorem for toposes: Every topos is equivalent to a category of étale presheaves on an open étale groupoid
1985	Michael Schlessinger–Jim Stasheff	L_{∞}-algebras
1985	André Joyal–Ross Street	Braided monoidal categories
1985	André Joyal–Ross Street	Joyal–Street coherence theorem for braided monoidal categories
1985	Paul Ghez–Ricardo Lima–John Roberts	C*-categories
1986	Joachim Lambek–Phil Scott	Influential book: Introduction to higher-order categorical logic
1986	Joachim Lambek–Phil Scott	Fundamental theorem of topology: The section-functor Γ and the germ-functor Λ establish a dual adjunction between the category of presheaves and the category of bundles (over the same topological space) which restricts to a dual equivalence of categories (or duality) between corresponding full subcategories of sheaves and of étale bundles
1986	Peter Freyd–David Yetter	Constructs the (compact braided) monoidal category of tangles
1986	Vladimir Drinfeld–Michio Jimbo	Quantum groups: In other words, quasitriangular Hopf algebras. The point is that the categories of representations of quantum groups are tensor categories with extra structure. They are used in construction of quantum invariants of knots and links and low-dimensional manifolds, representation theory, q-deformation theory, CFT, integrable systems. The invariants are constructed from braided monoidal categories that are categories of representations of quantum groups. The underlying structure of a TQFT is a modular category of representations of a quantum group
1986	Saunders Mac Lane	Mathematics, form and function (a foundation of mathematics)
1987	Jean-Yves Girard	Linear logic: The internal logic of a linear category (an enriched category with its Hom-sets being linear spaces)
1987	Peter Freyd	Freyd representation theorem for Grothendieck toposes
1987	Ross Street	Definition of the nerve of a weak n-category and thus obtaining the first definition of weak n-category using simplices
1987	Ross Street–John Roberts	Formulates Street–Roberts conjecture: Strict ω-categories are equivalent to complicial sets
1987	André Joyal–Ross Street–Mei Chee Shum	Ribbon categories: A balanced rigid braided monoidal category
1987	Ross Street	n-computads
1987	Iain Aitchison	Bottom up Pascal triangle algorithm for computing nonabelian n-cocycle conditions for nonabelian cohomology
1987	Vladimir Drinfeld-Gérard Laumon	Formulates geometric Langlands program
1987	Vladimir Turaev	Starts quantum topology by using quantum groups and R-matrices to giving an algebraic unification of most of the known knot polynomials. Especially important was Vaughan Jones and Edward Wittens work on the Jones polynomial
1988	Alex Heller	Heller axioms for homotopy theory as a special abstract hyperfunctor. A feature of this approach is a very general localization
1988	Alex Heller	Heller derivators, the dual of Grothendieck derivators
1988	Alex Heller	Gives a global closed model structure on the category of simplicial presheaves. John Jardine has also given a model structure in the category of simplicial presheaves
1988	Gregory Moore-Nathan Seiberg	Rational Conformal Field Theories lead to modular tensor categories
1988	Graeme Segal	Elliptic objects: A functor that is a categorified version of a vector bundle equipped with a connection, it is a 2D parallel transport for strings
1988	Graeme Segal	Conformal field theory CFT: A symmetric monoidal functor Z: nCob_{C}→Hilb satisfying some axioms
1988	Edward Witten	Topological quantum field theory TQFT: A monoidal functor Z: nCob→Hilb satisfying some axioms
1988	Edward Witten	Topological string theory
1989	Hans Baues	Influential book: Algebraic homotopy
1989	Michael Makkai-Robert Paré	Accessible categories: Categories with a "good" set of generators allowing to manipulate large categories as if they were small categories, without the fear of encountering any set-theoretic paradoxes. Locally presentable categories are complete accessible categories. Accessible categories are the categories of models of sketches. The name comes from that these categories are accessible as models of sketches.
1989	Edward Witten	Witten functional integral formalism and Witten invariants for manifolds.
1990	Peter Freyd	Allegories: An abstraction of the category of sets with relations as morphisms, it bears the same resemblance to binary relations as categories do to functions and sets. It is a category in which one has in addition to composition a unary operation reciprocation R° and a partial binary operation intersection R ∩ S, like in the category of sets with relations as morphisms (instead of functions) for which a number of axioms are required. It generalizes the relation algebra to relations between different sorts.
1990	Nicolai Reshetikhin–Vladimir Turaev–Edward Witten	Reshetikhin–Turaev–Witten invariants of knots from modular tensor categories of representations of quantum groups.

== 1991–2000 ==
Year	Contributors	Event
1991	Jean-Yves Girard	Polarization of linear logic.
1991	Ross Street	Parity complexes. A parity complex generates a free ω-category.
1991	André Joyal-Ross Street	Formalization of Penrose string diagrams to calculate with abstract tensors in various monoidal categories with extra structure. The calculus now depends on the connection with low-dimensional topology.
1991	Ross Street	Definition of the descent strict ω-category of a cosimplicial strict ω-category.
1991	Ross Street	Top down excision of extremals algorithm for computing nonabelian n-cocycle conditions for nonabelian cohomology.
1992	Yves Diers	Axiomatic categorical geometry using algebraic-geometric categories and algebraic-geometric functors.
1992	Saunders Mac Lane-Ieke Moerdijk	Influential book: Sheaves in geometry and logic.
1992	John Greenlees-Peter May	Greenlees-May duality
1992	Vladimir Turaev	Modular tensor categories. Special tensor categories that arise in constructing knot invariants, in constructing TQFTs and CFTs, as truncation (semisimple quotient) of the category of representations of a quantum group (at roots of unity), as categories of representations of weak Hopf algebras, as category of representations of a RCFT.
1992	Vladimir Turaev-Oleg Viro	Turaev-Viro state sum models based on spherical categories (the first state sum models) and Turaev-Viro state sum invariants for 3-manifolds.
1992	Vladimir Turaev	Shadow world of links: Shadows of links give shadow invariants of links by shadow state sums.
1993	Ruth Lawrence	Extended TQFTs
1993	David Yetter-Louis Crane	Crane-Yetter state sum models based on ribbon categories and Crane-Yetter state sum invariants for 4-manifolds.
1993	Kenji Fukaya	A_{∞}-categories and A_{∞}-functors: Most commonly in homological algebra, a category with several compositions such that the first composition is associative up to homotopy which satisfies an equation that holds up to another homotopy, etc. (associative up to higher homotopy). A stands for associative. Def: A category C such that: 1. for all X, Y in Ob(C) the Hom-sets Hom_{C}(X,Y) are finite-dimensional chain complexes of Z-graded modules 2. for all objects X_{1}, ..., X_{n} in Ob(C) there is a family of linear composition maps (the higher compositions); m_{n} : Hom_{C}(X_{0},X_{1}) ⊗ Hom_{C}(X_{1},X_{2}) ⊗ ... ⊗ Hom_{C}(X_{n−1},X_{n}) → Hom_{C}(X_{0},X_{n}) of degree n − 2 (homological grading convention is used) for n ≥ 1: 1. m_{1} is the differential on the chain complex Hom_{C}(X,Y); 2. m_{n} satisfy the quadratic A_{∞}-associativity equation for all n ≥ 0.; m_{1} and m_{2} will be chain maps but the compositions m_{i} of higher order are not chain maps; nevertheless they are Massey products. In particular it is a linear category. Examples are the Fukaya category Fuk(X) and loop space ΩX where X is a topological space and A_{∞}-algebras as A_{∞}-categories with one object. When there are no higher maps (trivial homotopies) C is a dg-category. Every A_{∞}-category is quasiisomorphic in a functorial way to a dg-category. A quasiisomorphism is a chain map that is an isomorphism in homology. The framework of dg-categories and dg-functors is too narrow for many problems, and it is preferable to consider the wider class of A_{∞}-categories and A_{∞}-functors. Many features of A_{∞}-categories and A_{∞}-functors come from the fact that they form a symmetric closed multicategory, which is revealed in the language of comonads. From a higher-dimensional perspective A_{∞}-categories are weak ω-categories with all morphisms invertible. A_{∞}-categories can also be viewed as noncommutative formal dg-manifolds with a closed marked subscheme of objects.
1993	John Barret-Bruce Westbury	Spherical categories: Monoidal categories with duals for diagrams on spheres instead for in the plane.
1993	Maxim Kontsevich	Kontsevich invariants for knots (are perturbation expansion Feynman integrals for the Witten functional integral) defined by the Kontsevich integral. They are the universal Vassiliev invariants for knots.
1993	Daniel Freed	A new view on TQFT using modular tensor categories that unifies three approaches to TQFT (modular tensor categories from path integrals).
1994	Francis Borceux	Handbook of Categorical Algebra (3 volumes).
1994	Jean Bénabou–Bruno Loiseau	Orbitals in a topos.
1994	Maxim Kontsevich	Formulates the homological mirror symmetry conjecture: X a compact symplectic manifold with first Chern class c_{1}(X) = 0 and Y a compact Calabi–Yau manifold are mirror pairs if and only if D(Fuk_{X}) (the derived category of the Fukaya triangulated category of X concocted out of Lagrangian cycles with local systems) is equivalent to a subcategory of D^{b}(Coh_{Y}) (the bounded derived category of coherent sheaves on Y).
1994	Louis Crane-Igor Frenkel	Hopf categories and construction of 4D TQFTs by them.
1994	John Fischer	Defines the 2-category of 2-knots (knotted surfaces).
1995	Bob Gordon-John Power-Ross Street	Tricategories and a corresponding coherence theorem: Every weak 3-category is equivalent to a Gray 3-category.
1995	Ross Street–Dominic Verity	Surface diagrams for tricategories.
1995	Louis Crane	Coins categorification leading to the categorical ladder.
1995	Sjoerd Crans	A general procedure of transferring closed model structures on a category along adjoint functor pairs to another category.
1995	André Joyal-Ieke Moerdijk	AST, Algebraic set theory: Also sometimes called categorical set theory. It was developed from 1988 by André Joyal and Ieke Moerdijk, and was first presented in detail as a book in 1995 by them. AST is a framework based on category theory to study and organize set theories and to construct models of set theories. The aim of AST is to provide a uniform categorical semantics or description of set theories of different kinds (classical or constructive, bounded, predicative or impredicative, well-founded or non-well-founded, ...), the various constructions of the cumulative hierarchy of sets, forcing models, sheaf models and realisability models. Instead of focusing on categories of sets AST focuses on categories of classes. The basic tool of AST is the notion of a category with class structure (a category of classes equipped with a class of small maps (the intuition being that their fibres are small in some sense), powerclasses and a universal object (a universe)) which provides an axiomatic framework in which models of set theory can be constructed. The notion of a class category permits both the definition of ZF-algebras (Zermelo-Fraenkel algebras) and related structures expressing the idea that the hierarchy of sets is an algebraic structure on the one hand and the interpretation of the first-order logic of elementary set theory on the other. The subcategory of sets in a class category is an elementary topos and every elementary topos occurs as sets in a class category. The class category itself always embeds into the ideal completion of a topos. The interpretation of the logic is that in every class category the universe is a model of basic intuitionistic set theory (BIST) that is logically complete with respect to class category models. Therefore, class categories generalize both topos theory and intuitionistic set theory. AST founds and formalizes set theory on the ZF-algebra with operations union and successor (singleton) instead of on the membership relation. The ZF-axioms are nothing but a description of the free ZF-algebra just as the Peano axioms are a description of the free monoid on one generator. In this perspective the models of set theory are algebras for a suitably presented algebraic theory and many familiar set theoretic conditions (such as well-foundedness) are related to familiar algebraic conditions (such as freeness). Using an auxiliary notion of small map it is possible to extend the axioms of a topos and provide a general theory for uniformly constructing models of set theory out of toposes.
1995	Michael Makkai	SFAM, Structuralist foundation of abstract mathematics. In SFAM the universe consists of higher-dimensional categories, functors are replaced by saturated anafunctors, sets are abstract sets, the formal logic for entities is FOLDS (first-order logic with dependent sorts) in which the identity relation is not given a priori by first-order axioms but derived from within a context.
1995	John Baez-James Dolan	Opetopic sets (opetopes) based on operads. Weak n-categories are n-opetopic sets.
1995	John Baez-James Dolan	Introduced the periodic table of mathematics which identifies k-tuply monoidal n-categories. It mirrors the table of homotopy groups of the spheres.
1995	John Baez–James Dolan	Outlined a program in which n-dimensional TQFTs are described as n-category representations.
1995	John Baez–James Dolan	Proposed n-dimensional deformation quantization.
1995	John Baez–James Dolan	Tangle hypothesis: The n-category of framed n-tangles in n + k dimensions is (n + k)-equivalent to the free weak k-tuply monoidal n-category with duals on one object.
1995	John Baez-James Dolan	Cobordism hypothesis (Extended TQFT hypothesis I): The n-category of which n-dimensional extended TQFTs are representations, nCob, is the free stable weak n-category with duals on one object.
1995	John Baez-James Dolan	Stabilization hypothesis: After suspending a weak n-category n + 2 times, further suspensions have no essential effect. The suspension functor S: nCat_{k}→nCat_{k+1} is an equivalence of categories for k = n + 2.
1995	John Baez-James Dolan	Extended TQFT hypothesis II: An n-dimensional unitary extended TQFT is a weak n-functor, preserving all levels of duality, from the free stable weak n-category with duals on one object to nHilb.
1995	Valentin Lychagin	Categorical quantization
1995	Pierre Deligne-Vladimir Drinfeld-Maxim Kontsevich	Derived algebraic geometry with derived schemes and derived moduli stacks. A program of doing algebraic geometry and especially moduli problems in the derived category of schemes or algebraic varieties instead of in their normal categories.
1997	Maxim Kontsevich	Formal deformation quantization theorem: Every Poisson manifold admits a differentiable star product and they are classified up to equivalence by formal deformations of the Poisson structure.
1998	Claudio Hermida-Michael-Makkai-John Power	Multitopes, Multitopic sets.
1998	Carlos Simpson	Simpson conjecture: Every weak ∞-category is equivalent to a ∞-category in which composition and exchange laws are strict and only the unit laws are allowed to hold weakly. It is proven for 1,2,3-categories with a single object.
1998	André Hirschowitz-Carlos Simpson	Give a model category structure on the category of Segal categories. Segal categories are the fibrant-cofibrant objects and Segal maps are the weak equivalences. In fact they generalize the definition to that of a Segal n-category and give a model structure for Segal n-categories for any n ≥ 1.
1998	Chris Isham–Jeremy Butterfield	Kochen–Specker theorem in topos theory of presheaves: The spectral presheaf (the presheaf that assigns to each operator its spectrum) has no global elements (global sections) but may have partial elements or local elements. A global element is the analogue for presheaves of the ordinary idea of an element of a set. This is equivalent in quantum theory to the spectrum of the C*-algebra of observables in a topos having no points.
1998	Richard Thomas	Richard Thomas, a student of Simon Donaldson, introduces Donaldson–Thomas invariants which are systems of numerical invariants of complex oriented 3-manifolds X, analogous to Donaldson invariants in the theory of 4-manifolds. They are certain weighted Euler characteristics of the moduli space of sheaves on X and "count" Gieseker semistable coherent sheaves with fixed Chern character on X. Ideally the moduli spaces should be a critical sets of holomorphic Chern–Simons functions and the Donaldson–Thomas invariants should be the number of critical points of this function, counted correctly. Currently such holomorphic Chern–Simons functions exist at best locally.
1998	John Baez	Spin foam models: A 2-dimensional cell complex with faces labeled by representations and edges labeled by intertwining operators. Spin foams are functors between spin network categories. Any slice of a spin foam gives a spin network.
1998	John Baez–James Dolan	Microcosm principle: Certain algebraic structures can be defined in any category equipped with a categorified version of the same structure.
1998	Alexander Rosenberg	Noncommutative schemes: The pair (Spec(A),O_{A}) where A is an abelian category and to it is associated a topological space Spec(A) together with a sheaf of rings O_{A} on it. In the case when A = QCoh(X) for X a scheme the pair (Spec(A),O_{A}) is naturally isomorphic to the scheme (X^{Zar},O_{X}) using the equivalence of categories QCoh(Spec(R)) = Mod_{R}. More generally abelian categories or triangulated categories or dg-categories or A_{∞}-categories should be regarded as categories of quasicoherent sheaves (or complexes of sheaves) on noncommutative schemes. This is a starting point in noncommutative algebraic geometry. It means that one can think of the category A itself as a space. Since A is abelian it allows to naturally do homological algebra on noncommutative schemes and hence sheaf cohomology.
1998	Maxim Kontsevich	Calabi–Yau categories: A linear category with a trace map for each object of the category and an associated symmetric (with respects to objects) nondegenerate pairing to the trace map. If X is a smooth projective Calabi—Yau variety of dimension d then D^{b}(Coh(X)) is a unital Calabi–Yau A_{∞}-category of Calabi–Yau dimension d. A Calabi–Yau category with one object is a Frobenius algebra.
1999	Joseph Bernstein–Igor Frenkel–Mikhail Khovanov	Temperley–Lieb categories: Objects are enumerated by nonnegative integers. The set of homomorphisms from object n to object m is a free R-module with a basis over a ring R. R is given by the isotopy classes of systems of (|n| + |m|)/2 simple pairwise disjoint arcs inside a horizontal strip on the plane that connect in pairs |n| points on the bottom and |m| points on the top in some order. Morphisms are composed by concatenating their diagrams. Temperley–Lieb categories are categorized Temperley–Lieb algebras.
1999	Moira Chas–Dennis Sullivan	Constructs string topology by cohomology. This is string theory on general topological manifolds.
1999	Mikhail Khovanov	Khovanov homology: A homology theory for knots such that the dimensions of the homology groups are the coefficients of the Jones polynomial of the knot.
1999	Vladimir Turaev	Homotopy quantum field theory HQFT
1999	Vladimir Voevodsky–Fabien Morel	Constructs the homotopy category of schemes.
1999	Ronald Brown–George Janelidze	2-dimensional Galois theory
2000	Vladimir Voevodsky	Gives two constructions of motivic cohomology of varieties, by model categories in homotopy theory and by a triangulated category of DM-motives.
2000	Yasha Eliashberg–Alexander Givental–Helmut Hofer	Symplectic field theory SFT: A functor Z from a geometric category of framed Hamiltonian structures and framed cobordisms between them to an algebraic category of certain differential D-modules and Fourier integral operators between them and satisfying some axioms.
2000	Paul Taylor	ASD (Abstract Stone duality): A reaxiomatisation of the space and maps in general topology in terms of λ-calculus of computable continuous functions and predicates that is both constructive and computable. The topology on a space is treated not as a lattice, but as an exponential object of the same category as the original space, with an associated λ-calculus. Every expression in the λ-calculus denotes both a continuous function and a program. ASD does not use the category of sets, but the full subcategory of overt discrete objects plays this role (an overt object is the dual to a compact object), forming an arithmetic universe (pretopos with lists) with general recursion.

== 2001–present ==
Year	Contributors	Event
2001	Charles Rezk	Constructs a model category with certain generalized Segal categories as the fibrant objects, thus obtaining a model for a homotopy theory of homotopy theories. Complete Segal spaces are introduced at the same time.
2001	Charles Rezk	Model toposes and their generalization homotopy toposes (a model topos without the t-completeness assumption).
2002	Bertrand Toën-Gcabriele Vezzosi	Segal toposes coming from Segal topologies, Segal sites and stacks over them.
2002	Bertrand Toën-Gabriele Vezzosi	Homotopical algebraic geometry: The main idea is to extend schemes by formally replacing the rings with any kind of "homotopy-ring-like object". More precisely this object is a commutative monoid in a symmetric monoidal category endowed with a notion of equivalences which are understood as "up-to-homotopy monoid" (e.g. E_{∞}-rings).
2002	Peter Johnstone	Influential book: sketches of an elephant – a topos theory compendium. It serves as an encyclopedia of topos theory (two out of three volumes published as of 2008).
2003	Denis-Charles Cisinski	Makes further work on ABC model categories and brings them back into light. From then they are called ABC model categories after their contributors.
2004	Mario Caccamo	Formal category theoretical expanded λ-calculus for categories.
2004	Francis Borceux-Dominique Bourn	Homological categories
2004	Samson Abramsky and Bob Coecke	Paper A categorical semantics of quantum protocols published that starts the Oxford school of Categorical Quantum Mechanics, based on the theory of compact closed categories.
2004	William Dwyer-Philips Hirschhorn-Daniel Kan-Jeffrey Smith	Introduces in the book Homotopy limit functors on model categories and homotopical categories a formalism of homotopical categories and homotopical functors (weak equivalence preserving functors) that generalize the model category formalism of Daniel Quillen. A homotopical category has only a distinguished class of morphisms (containing all isomorphisms) called weak equivalences and satisfy the two out of six axiom. This allows to define homotopical versions of initial and terminal objects, limit and colimit functors (that are computed by local constructions in the book), completeness and cocompleteness, adjunctions, Kan extensions and universal properties.
2004	Dominic Verity	Proves the Street-Roberts conjecture.
2004	Ross Street	Definition of the descent weak ω-category of a cosimplicial weak ω-category.
2004	Ross Street	Characterization theorem for cosmoses: A bicategory M is a cosmos iff there exists a base bicategory W such that M is biequivalent to Mod_{W}. W can be taken to be any full subbicategory of M whose objects form a small Cauchy generator.
2004	Ross Street-Brian Day	Quantum categories and quantum groupoids: A quantum category over a braided monoidal category V is an object R with an opmorphism h: R^{op} ⊗ R → A into a pseudomonoid A such that h^{*} is strong monoidal (preserves tensor product and unit up to coherent natural isomorphisms) and all R, h and A lie in the autonomous monoidal bicategory Comod(V)^{co} of comonoids. Comod(V) = Mod(V^{op})^{coop}. Quantum categories were introduced to generalize Hopf algebroids and groupoids. A quantum groupoid is a Hopf algebra with several objects.
2004	Stephan Stolz-Peter Teichner	Definition of nD QFT of degree p parametrized by a manifold.
2004	Stephan Stolz-Peter Teichner	Graeme Segal proposed in the 1980s to provide a geometric construction of elliptic cohomology (the precursor to tmf) as some kind of moduli space of CFTs. Stephan Stolz and Peter Teichner continued and expanded these ideas in a program to construct TMF as a moduli space of supersymmetric Euclidean field theories. They conjectured a Stolz-Teichner picture (analogy) between classifying spaces of cohomology theories in the chromatic filtration (de Rham cohomology, K-theory, Morava K-theories) and moduli spaces of supersymmetric QFTs parametrized by a manifold (proved in 0D and 1D).
2005	Peter Selinger	Coined the term Dagger categories and dagger functors. Dagger categories seem to be part of a larger framework involving n-categories with duals.
2005	Peter Ozsváth-Zoltán Szabó	Knot Floer homology
2006	P. Carrasco-A.R. Garzon-E.M. Vitale	Categorical crossed modules
2006	Aslak Bakke Buan–Robert Marsh–Markus Reineke–Idun Reiten–Gordana Todorov	Cluster categories: Cluster categories are a special case of triangulated Calabi–Yau categories of Calabi–Yau dimension 2 and a generalization of cluster algebras.
2006	Jacob Lurie	Monumental book: Higher topos theory: In its 940 pages Jacob Lurie generalizes the common concepts of category theory to higher categories and defines n-toposes, ∞-toposes, sheaves of n-types, ∞-sites, ∞-Yoneda lemma and proves Lurie characterization theorem for higher-dimensional toposes. Lurie's theory of higher toposes can be interpreted as giving a good theory of sheaves taking values in ∞-categories. Roughly an ∞-topos is an ∞-category which looks like the ∞-category of all homotopy types. In a topos mathematics can be done. In a higher topos not only mathematics can be done but also "n-geometry", which is higher homotopy theory. The topos hypothesis is that the (n+1)-category nCat is a Grothendieck (n+1)-topos. Higher topos theory can also be used in a purely algebro-geometric way to solve various moduli problems in this setting. An introduction into this circle of ideas can be found in the Kerodon project.
2007	Bernhard Keller-Hugh Thomas	d-cluster categories
2007	Dennis Gaitsgory-Jacob Lurie	Presents a derived version of the geometric Satake equivalence and formulates a geometric Langlands duality for quantum groups. The geometric Satake equivalence realized the category of representations of the Langlands dual group ^{L}G in terms of spherical perverse sheaves (or D-modules) on the affine Grassmannian Gr_{G} = G((t))/G[[t]] of the original group G.
2008	Ieke Moerdijk-Clemens Berger	Extends and improved the definition of Reedy category to become invariant under equivalence of categories.
2008	Michael J. Hopkins–Jacob Lurie	Sketch of proof of Baez-Dolan tangle hypothesis and Baez-Dolan cobordism hypothesis which classify extended TQFT in all dimensions. Jacob Lurie later publishes the complete proof of the cobordism hypothesis (2010).
2019	Brendan Fong–David Spivak	First textbook for the emerging field identifying itself as applied category theory, in which category theory is applied outside pure mathematics: An Invitation to Applied Category Theory: Seven Sketches in Compositionality

== See also ==
- EGA
- FGA
- SGA
