= Milnor's theorem on Kan complexes =

In mathematics, especially algebraic topology, a theorem of Milnor says that the geometric realization functor from the homotopy category of the category Kan of Kan complexes to the homotopy category of the category Top of (reasonable) topological spaces is fully faithful. The theorem in particular implies Kan and Top have the same homotopy category.

In today’s language, Kan is typically identified as ∞-Grpd, the category of ∞-groupoids. Thus, the theorem can be viewed as an instance of Grothendieck's homotopy hypothesis which says ∞-groupoids are spaces (or that they can model spaces from the homotopy theory point of view).

The pointed version of the theorem is also true.

== Proof ==
A key step in the proof of the theorem is the following result (which is also sometimes called Milnor's theorem):

Proposition— For a Kan complex $X$, let $\eta_X : X \to \operatorname{Sing}(|X|)$ be a unit of the adjunction between the geometric realization and the singular complex functor. Then $\eta_X$ is a homotopy equivalence; i.e., $\pi_n \eta_X : \pi_n X \to \pi_n \operatorname{Sing}(|X|)$ is bijective for each $n$.

Indeed, the above says that $\eta : \operatorname{id} \to \operatorname{Sing}(| -|)$ is invertible on the homotopy category or, equivalently, $| - |$ is fully faithful there.

== Sources ==
- Gabriel, Pierre; Zisman, Michel (1967). Calculus of Fractions and Homotopy Theory (PDF). Ergebnisse der Mathematik und ihrer Grenzgebiete. Vol. 35. Springer.
- Joyal, André; Tierney, Myles (2008). Notes on simplicial homotopy theory (PDF). CRM Barcelona. Archived from the original (PDF) on 6 July 2011.
