= Oleg Viro =

Russian mathematician (born 1948)

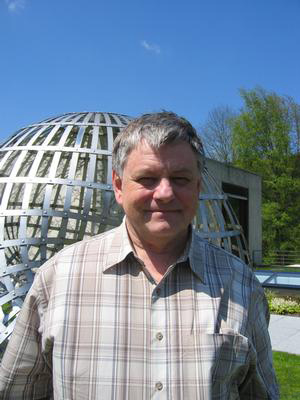
Oleg Viro in 2008 at the Mathematical Research Institute of Oberwolfach

Oleg Yanovich Viro (Russian: Олег Янович Виро) (b. 13 May 1948, Leningrad, USSR) is a Russian mathematician in the fields of topology and algebraic geometry, most notably real algebraic geometry, tropical geometry and knot theory.

== Contributions ==
Viro developed a "patchworking" technique in algebraic geometry, which allows real algebraic varieties to be constructed by a "cut and paste" method. Using this technique, Viro completed the isotopy classification of non-singular plane projective curves of degree 7. The patchworking technique was one of the fundamental ideas which motivated the development of tropical geometry. In topology, Viro is most known for his joint work with Vladimir Turaev, in which the Turaev–Viro invariants (relatives of the Reshetikhin-Turaev invariants) and related topological quantum field theory notions were introduced.

== Education and career ==
Viro studied at the Leningrad State University where he received his Ph.D. degree in 1974; his advisor was Vladimir Rokhlin. Viro taught from 1973 until 1991 at Leningrad State University. Since 1986 he has been a member of the Saint Petersburg Department of the Steklov Institute of Mathematics. In 1992-1997, Viro was a F. B. Jones chair professor in Topology at the University of California, Riverside.

In 1994-2003 he was a professor at Uppsala University, Sweden. On 8 February 2007, Viro and his colleague Burglind Juhl-Jöricke were forced to resign from the university. There had been a history of conflict at the Mathematics Institute, with allegations of disagreeable behavior by several parties in the conflict. A number of Swedish, European and American mathematicians protested the manner in which the two Professors of Mathematics were forced to resign. These protests include the following:

- an open letter by Lennart Carleson, former president of the International Mathematical Union,
- a letter by Ari Laptev, current president of the European Mathematical Society, and
- a letter from M. Salah Baouendi, Arthur Jaffe, Joel Lebowitz, Elliott H. Lieb and Nicolai Reshetikhin.

As of 2009, Viro is a senior researcher at the St. Petersburg Department of the Steklov Institute of Mathematics, and a professor at Stony Brook University.

== Awards and honors ==
Viro was an invited speaker at the International Congress of Mathematicians in 1983 (Warsaw) and the European Congress of Mathematicians in 2000 (Barcelona). He was awarded the Göran Gustafsson Prize (1997) by the Swedish government.

In 2012 he became a fellow of the American Mathematical Society.
