= Weak n-category =

Higher category theory concept

In category theory in mathematics, a weak n-category is a generalization of the notion of strict n-category where composition and identities are not strictly associative and unital, but only associative and unital up to coherent equivalence or coherent isomorphism. A weak 0-category is just a set, and a weak 1-category is an ordinarily category. This generalisation only becomes noticeable at dimensions two and above where weak 2-, 3- and 4-categories are typically referred to as bicategories, tricategories, and tetracategories.

== History ==
There is much work to determine what the coherence laws for weak n-categories should be. Weak n-categories have become the main object of study in higher category theory. There are basically two classes of theories: those in which the higher cells and higher compositions are realized algebraically (most remarkably Michael Batanin's theory of weak higher categories) and those in which more topological models are used (e.g. a higher category as a simplicial set satisfying some universality properties).

In a terminology due to John Baez and James Dolan, a (n, k)-category is a weak n-category, such that all h-cells for h > k are invertible. Some of the formalism for (n, k)-categories are much simpler than those for general n-categories. In particular, several technically accessible formalisms of (infinity, 1)-categories are now known. Now the most popular such formalism centers on a notion of quasi-category, other approaches include a properly understood theory of simplicially enriched categories and the approach via Segal categories; a class of examples of stable (infinity, 1)-categories can be modeled (in the case of characteristics zero) also via pretriangulated A-infinity categories of Maxim Kontsevich. Quillen model categories are viewed as a presentation of an (infinity, 1)-category; however not all (infinity, 1)-categories can be presented via model categories.

== See also ==
- Infinity category
- Opetope
- Stabilization hypothesis
