= Joyal's theta category =

In mathematics, especially category theory, Joyal's theta category $\Theta$ is an alternative to the simplex category $\Delta$. It was introduced by André Joyal to give a definition of an ∞-category using $\Theta$-sets = presheaves on $\Theta$ instead of simplicial sets = presheaves on $\Delta$. Namely, in the definition of Boardman and Vogt (which is the standard definition today), an ∞-category is defined as a simplicial set satisfying the weak Kan condition. In a similar way, Joyal proposed to define an ∞-category as a $\Theta$-set satisfying the weak Kan condition.

In practice, the category $\Theta$ is often used to define (∞, n)-categories.

== See also ==
- test category
