= Globular set =

A globular set with 0-cells (vertices), 1-cells (gray edges), 2-cells (red edges), and 3-cells (blue edges). The source and target of each $k$-cell must be single ($k$-1)-cells. For example, the red edge A connects single 1-cells a and b, while B connects c and d, and C forms a self-connection on c.

In category theory, a branch of mathematics, a globular set is a higher-dimensional generalization of a directed graph. Precisely, it is a sequence of sets $X_0, X_1, X_2, \dots$ equipped with pairs of functions $s_n, t_n: X_n \to X_{n-1}$ such that

- $s_n \circ s_{n+1} = s_n \circ t_{n+1},$
- $t_n \circ s_{n+1} = t_n \circ t_{n+1}.$

(Equivalently, it is a presheaf on the category of “globes”.) The letters "s", "t" stand for "source" and "target" and one imagines $X_n$ consists of directed edges at level n.

In the context of a graph, each dimension is represented as a set of $k$-cells. Vertices would make up the 0-cells, edges connecting vertices would be 1-cells, and then each dimension higher connects groups of the dimension beneath it.

It can be viewed as a specific instance of the polygraph. In a polygraph, a source or target of a $k$-cell may consist of an entire path of elements of ($k$-1)-cells, but a globular set restricts this to singular elements of ($k$-1)-cells.

A variant of the notion was used by Grothendieck to introduce the notion of an ∞-groupoid. Extending Grothendieck's work, gave a definition of a weak ∞-category in terms of globular sets.
