= Joyal's extension and lifting theorems =

In mathematics, Joyal's theorem is a theorem in homotopy theory that provides necessary and sufficient conditions for the solvability of a certain lifting problem involving simplicial sets. In particular, in higher category theory, it proves the statement "an ∞-groupoid is a Kan complex", which is a version of the homotopy hypothesis.

The theorem was introduced by André Joyal.

== Joyal's extension theorem ==
Let $C$ be quasicategory and let $u:X \rightarrow Y$ be a morphism of $C$. The following conditions are equivalent:

(1) The morphism $u$ is an isomorphism.

(2) Let $n \geq 2$ and let $\sigma_0 : \Lambda^n_0 \to C$ be a morphism of simplicial sets for which the initial edge

$\Delta^1 \cong N_{\bullet }( \{ 0 < 1\} ) \rightarrow \Lambda^n_ 0 \xrightarrow {\sigma _0} C$

is equal to $u$. Then $\sigma_0$ can be extended to an n-simplex $\sigma : \Delta^n \to C$.

(3) Let $n \geq 2$ and let $\sigma_0 : \Lambda^n_n \rightarrow C$ be a morphism of simplicial sets for which the initial edge

$\Delta^1 \cong N_{\bullet }( \{ n-1 < n\} ) \rightarrow \Lambda^n_ n \xrightarrow {\sigma _0} C$

is equal to $u$. Then $\sigma_0$ can be extended to an n-simplex $\sigma : \Delta^n \to C$.

== Joyal's lifting theorem ==
Let $p: C \rightarrow D$ be an inner fibration (Joyal used mid-fibration) between quasicategories, and let $f \in C_1$ be an edge such that $p (f)$ is an isomorphism in $D$. The following are equivalent:

(1) The edge $f$ is an isomorphism in $C$.

(2) For all $n \geq 2$, every diagram of the form

admits a lift.

(3) For all $n \geq 2$, every diagram of the form

admits a lift.
