= Tetracategory =

In category theory, a tetracategory is a weakened definition of a 4-category. The definition of tetracategory and its coherence conditions were introduced by Trimble. The formal definition of Trimble's tetracategory is given using the coherence theorem for tricategories. There is no coherence theorem for tetracategories yet. Hoffnung says that, a monoidal tricategory is a one-object tetracategory in the sense of Trimble.

== See also ==
- Weak n-category
- infinity category
