= Joyal's theorem =

Joyal's theorem may refer to:

- Joyal's extension theorem
- Joyal's lifting theorem
- Joyal's completeness theorem

== See also ==
- Quasi-category § Definition – with a result by Joyal on uniqueness of composition law
