= Homotopy hypothesis =

Hypothesis in mathematical category theory

In category theory, a branch of mathematics, Grothendieck's homotopy hypothesis states, homotopy-theoretically speaking, that the ∞-groupoids are spaces.

One version of the hypothesis was claimed to be proved in the 1991 paper by Kapranov and Voevodsky. Their proof turned out to be flawed and their result in the form interpreted by Carlos Simpson is now known as the Simpson conjecture.

In higher category theory, one considers a space-valued presheaf instead of a set-valued presheaf in ordinary category theory. In view of homotopy hypothesis, a space here can be taken to an ∞-groupoid.

== Formulations ==
A precise formulation of the hypothesis very strongly depends on the definition of an ∞-groupoid. One definition is that, mimicking the ordinary category case, an ∞-groupoid is an ∞-category in which each morphism is invertible or equivalently its homotopy category is a groupoid.

Now, if an ∞-category is defined as a simplicial set satisfying the weak Kan condition, as done commonly today, then ∞-groupoids amounts exactly to Kan complexes (= simplicial sets with the Kan condition) by the following argument. If $X$ is a Kan complex (viewed as an ∞-category) and $f$ a morphism in it, consider $\sigma : \Lambda_0^2 \to X$ from the horn such that $\sigma(0 \to 1) = f, \, \sigma(0 \to 2) = \operatorname{id}$. By the Kan condition, $\sigma$ extends to $\overline{\sigma} : \Delta^2 \to X$ and the image $g = \overline{\sigma}(1 \to 2)$ is a left inverse of $f$. Similarly, $f$ has a right inverse and so is invertible. The converse, that an ∞-groupoid is a Kan complex, is less trivial and is due to Joyal (see Joyal's theorem).

Because of the above fact, it is common to define ∞-groupoids simply as Kan complexes. Now, a theorem of Milnor and CW approximation say that Kan complexes completely determine the homotopy theory of (reasonable) topological spaces. So, this essentially proves the hypothesis. In particular, if ∞-groupoids are defined as Kan complexes (bypassing Joyal’s result), then the hypothesis is almost trivial.

However, if an ∞-groupoid is defined in different ways, then the hypothesis is usually still open. In particular, the hypothesis with Grothendieck's original definition of an ∞-groupoid is still open.

== n-version ==
There is also a version of homotopy hypothesis for (weak) n-groupoids, which roughly says

Homotopy hypothesis—A (weak) n-groupoid is exactly the same as a homotopy n-type.

The statement requires several clarifications:

- An n-groupoid is typically defined as an n-category where each morphism is invertible. So, in particular, the meaning depends on the meaning of an n-category (e.g., usually some weak version of an n-category),
- "the same as" usually means some equivalence (see below), and the definition of an equivalence typically uses some higher notions like an ∞-category,
- A homotopy n-type means a reasonable topological space with vanishing i-th homotopy groups, i > n at each base point (so a homotopy n-type here is really a weak homotopy n-type to be precise).

Moreover, the equivalence between the two notions is supposed to be given on one direction by a higher version of a fundamental groupoid, or the fundamental n-groupoid $\Pi_n(X)$ of a space X where

- an object is a point in X,
- a 1-morphism $f : x \to y$ is a path from a point x to a point y, with the compositions the concatenation of two paths,
- a 2-morphism is a homotopy from a path $f : x \to y$ to a path $g : x \to y$,
- a 3-morphism is a "map" between homotopies,
- and so on until n-morphisms.

The other direction is given by geometric realization.

This version is still open.

See also: Eilenberg–MacLane space, crossed module.

== See also ==
- Algebraic homotopy
- N-group (category theory)
- Pursuing Stacks
- Quasi-category
- Stratified space
