= Cosmos (category theory) =

In the area of mathematics known as category theory, a cosmos is a symmetric closed monoidal category that is complete and cocomplete. Enriched category theory is often considered over a cosmos.
