= Stabilization hypothesis =

In mathematics, specifically in category theory and algebraic topology, the Baez–Dolan stabilization hypothesis, proposed in (Baez & Dolan 1995), states that suspension of a weak n-category has no more essential effect after n + 2 times. Precisely, it states that the suspension functor $\mathsf{nCat}_k \to \mathsf{nCat}_{k+1}$ is an equivalence for $k \ge n + 2$.

== Sources ==
- Baez, John C.; Dolan, James (1995), "Higher-dimensional algebra and topological quantum field theory", Journal of Mathematical Physics, 36 (11): 6073–6105, arXiv:q-alg/9503002, Bibcode:1995JMP....36.6073B, doi:10.1063/1.531236, MR 1355899, S2CID 14908618
