= Homotopy associative algebra =

In mathematics, an algebra such as $(\R,+,\cdot)$ has multiplication $\cdot$ whose associativity is well-defined on the nose. This means for any real numbers $a,b,c\in \R$ we have

$$a\cdot(b\cdot c) - (a\cdot b)\cdot c = 0$$.

But, there are algebras $R$ which are not necessarily associative, meaning if $a,b,c\in R$ then

$$a\cdot(b\cdot c) - (a\cdot b)\cdot c \neq 0$$

in general. There is a notion of algebras, called $A_\infty$-algebras, which still have a property on the multiplication which still acts like the first relation, meaning associativity holds, but only holds up to a homotopy, which is a way to say after an operation "compressing" the information in the algebra, the multiplication is associative. This means although we get something which looks like the second equation, the one of inequality, we actually get equality after "compressing" the information in the algebra.

The study of $A_\infty$-algebras is a subset of homotopical algebra, where there is a homotopical notion of associative algebras through a differential graded algebra with a multiplication operation and a series of higher homotopies giving the failure for the multiplication to be associative. Loosely, an $A_\infty$-algebra $(A^\bullet, m_i)$ is a $\Z$-graded vector space over a field $k$ with a series of operations $m_i$ on the $i$-th tensor powers of $A^\bullet$. The $m_1$ corresponds to a chain complex differential, $m_2$ is the multiplication map, and the higher $m_i$ are a measure of the failure of associativity of the $m_2$. When looking at the underlying cohomology algebra $H(A^\bullet, m_1)$, the map $m_2$ should be an associative map. Then, these higher maps $m_3,m_4,\ldots$ should be interpreted as higher homotopies, where $m_3$ is the failure of $m_2$ to be associative, $m_4$ is the failure for $m_3$ to be higher associative, and so forth. Their structure was originally discovered by Jim Stasheff while studying A∞-spaces, but this was interpreted as a purely algebraic structure later on. These are spaces equipped with maps that are associative only up to homotopy, and the A∞ structure keeps track of these homotopies, homotopies of homotopies, and so forth.

They are ubiquitous in homological mirror symmetry because of their necessity in defining the structure of the Fukaya category of D-branes on a Calabi–Yau manifold who have only a homotopy associative structure.

== Definition ==
=== Definition ===
For a fixed field $k$ an $A_\infty$-algebra is a $\Z$-graded vector space

$$A = \bigoplus_{p \in \Z}A_p$$

equipped with morphisms $m_i \colon A^{\otimes i} \to A$ of degree $2 - i$ for each $i \geq 1$ satisfying a coherence condition: for all $n$,

$$\sum_{j+k+l=n,\,j+1+l=i} (-1)^{jk+l} m_i(\mathrm{id}^{\otimes j} \otimes m_k \otimes \mathrm{id}^{\otimes l}) = 0$$.

An $A_\infty$-morphism of $A_\infty$-algebras $f: A \to B$ is a family of morphisms $f_i: A^{\otimes i} \to B$ of degree $i-1$ satisfying a similar coherence condition: for all $n$,
$$\sum_{j+k+l=n,\,j+1+l=i} (-1)^{jk+l} f_i(\mathrm{id}^{\otimes j} \otimes m_k \otimes \mathrm{id}^{\otimes l}) = \sum_{i_1+\cdots+i_r=n} (-1)^s m_r(f_{i_1} \otimes \cdots \otimes f_{i_r})$$
where $s = \sum_{2 \leq u \leq r}((1-i_u)\sum_{i \leq v \leq u} i_v)$. (In both coherence conditions, the signs in the sums can be bypassed by shifting the grading by one.)

=== Understanding the coherence conditions ===
The coherence conditions are easy to write down for low degrees.

==== n=1 ====
For $n = 1$ this is the condition that

$$m_1(m_1(a_1)) = 0$$,

since $j+1+l=1$ gives $j=l=0$ and thus $k=1=i$. This means that $m_1$ is a differential on $A$.

==== n=2 ====
The coherence condition for $n=2$ gives
$$m_1 \circ m_2 (a_1 \otimes a_2) - m_2 \circ (1 \otimes m_1)(a_1 \otimes a_2) - m_2 \circ (m_1 \otimes 1)(a_1 \otimes a_2) = 0,$$
or
$$m_1(m_2(a_1 \otimes a_2)) = m_2(m_1(a_1) \otimes a_2) + (-1)^{|a_1|}m_2(a_1 \otimes m_1(a_2)).$$
This is the fact that the multiplication $m_2$ is a chain map with respect to the differential $m_1$.

==== n=3 ====
In this degree the coherence condition reads

$$\begin{align}
m_2(m_2(a_1\otimes a_2)\otimes a_3) - m_2(a_1\otimes m_2(a_2\otimes a_3)) =& +m_3(m_1(a_1)\otimes a_2\otimes a_3) \\
&-m_3(a_1\otimes m_1(a_2)\otimes a_3) \\
& + m_3(a_1\otimes a_2\otimes m_1(a_3)) \\
& + m_1(m_3(a_1\otimes a_2 \otimes a_3)).
\end{align}$$

Notice that the left hand side of the equation is the failure of the multiplication $m_2$ to make $A$ into an algebra which is associative on the nose. The right hand side is the differential on $A$ applied to the triple product plus the triple product applied to the differential on $A \otimes A \otimes A$, and says precisely that associativity holds up to a homotopy given by $m_3$. In particular, we have that the multiplication induced by $m_2$ on $H_*(A,m_1)$ is strictly associative.

Note if $m_3=0$ then $(A,m_1)$ is a differential graded algebra with multiplication $m_2$, as the vanishing of $m_3$ means that $m_2$ is associative on the nose.

==== n=4 and higher order terms ====
In higher degrees the coherency conditions give many different terms. We can arrange the right hand side to be a chain homotopy given by $m_n$ as we did in the case of $n=3$:

$$\begin{align}
&\pm m_n(m_1(a_1) \otimes \cdots \otimes a_n)) \\ &\pm \cdots \\
&\pm m_n(a_1 \otimes \cdots \otimes m_1(a_n)) \\
&\pm m_1(m_n(a_1 \otimes \cdots \otimes a_n)),
\end{align}$$

while the terms on the left hand side indicate the failure of lower $m_i$ terms to satisfy a kind of generalized associativity. In essence, this means that an $A_\infty$ algebra may fail to be "higher-associative" in every degree, but at every degree its failure to be so will be parametrized by a chain homotopy given by the higher multiplication in the next degree.

=== Diagrammatic interpretation of axioms ===
There is a nice diagrammatic formalism of algebras which is described in Algebra+Homotopy=Operad explaining how to visually think about this higher homotopies. This intuition is encapsulated with the discussion above algebraically, but it is useful to visualize it as well.

=== The bar construction; interpretation as a coderivation ===
Since the definition of an $A_\infty$-algebra requires an infinite sequence of higher multiplications, one might hope that there is a way to repackage the definition in terms of a single structure with finitely many operations. This is possible (after a little setup) by reinterpreting the $m_i$ as components of a single map instead.

Given a (graded) vector space $V$, the reduced tensor coalgebra $\overline{T^c}V$ on $V$ is $\bigoplus_{n \geq 1} V^{\otimes n}$ with the (non-cocommutative) coproduct $\Delta_{\overline{T^c}}$ given by splitting of tensors, i.e., $\Delta(v_1 \otimes \cdots \otimes v_n) = \sum_{1 \leq i < n}(v_1 \otimes \cdots \otimes v_i) | (v_{i+1} \otimes \cdots \otimes v_n)$, where we write the internal tensor product of $\overline{T^c}V$ with the standard tensor product symbol and the external tensor product used in defining a coproduct with the vertical stroke for clarity. Given any coalgebra $C$, there is a canonical filtration of $C$ defined by $F_kC = \ker \Delta^{(k+1)}$, where $\Delta^{(2)} = \Delta_C$, $\Delta^{(n)} = (\mathrm{id}^{\otimes (n-2)} \otimes \Delta_C) \circ \Delta^{(n-1)}$; $C$ is called cocomplete if $C = \bigcup_k F_kC$. The reduced tensor coalgebra is the universal cocomplete coalgebra over $V$, i.e., for any other cocomplete coalgebra $C'$, there is a natural bijection between the coalgebra maps from $C'$ to $\overline{T^c}V$ and the graded vector space maps $C' \to V$.

A coderivation on a coalgebra $C$ is a $k$-module map $D: C \to C$ satisfying the "co-Leibniz rule"$\Delta_C \circ D = (D \otimes \mathrm{id} + \mathrm{id} \otimes D) \circ \Delta_C$. The suspension $SV$ of a graded vector space $V$ is the graded vector space defined by $(SV)^i = V^{i+1}$.

With this notation, we have the following fact: an $A_\infty$-algebra structure on a graded vector space $A$ is the same thing as a coderivation $D$ on $\overline{T^c}(SA)$ which is a differential, that is, $D^2 = 0$. To see this, note that $D$ is determined by its composite with the quotient $\overline{T^c}(SA) \to SA$ since $\overline{T^c}V$ is the cofree cocomplete coalgebra on $V$. We obtain the $m_n$ by decomposing the composite into $b_n: (SA)^{\otimes n} \to SA$ and unshifting the map to a map from $A^{\otimes n}$ to $A$. The condition that $D$ be a coderivation yields $D = b_1' + b_2' + b_3' + \cdots$, with $b_i'(v_1\otimes \cdots \otimes v_j) = \sum_{a+i+b=j} v_1 \otimes \cdots \otimes v_a \otimes b_i(v_{a+1} \otimes \cdots \otimes v_{a+i}) \otimes v_{a+i+1} \otimes \cdots \otimes v_j$, and the condition that $D^2 = 0$ yields $\sum_{i+j-1=m} b_i'(b_j'(v_1 \otimes \cdots \otimes v_m)) = 0$ for all $m$, or equivalently $\sum_{j+k+l=m,j+1+l=i} b_i(\mathrm{id}^{\otimes j} \otimes b_k \otimes \mathrm{id}^{\otimes l}) = 0$, which unshifts to the standard (signed) conditions on the $m_n$ due to the sign rule for shifting complexes. The differential graded coalgebra $(\overline{T^c}(SA),D)$ defined in this way is called the bar construction on $A$ and denoted $BA$.

Many notions are easier to write out by considering $A_\infty$-algebras via their bar constructions. For instance, a morphism $f: A \to A'$ of $A_\infty$-algebras is equivalently a morphism of differential graded coalgebras $Bf: BA \to BA'$, a quasiisomorphism of $A_\infty$-algebras is equivalently a quasiisomorphism of differential graded coalgebras, and a homotopy between $A_\infty$-algebra morphisms is equivalently a homotopy between differential graded coalgebra morphisms.

== Examples ==
=== Associative algebras ===
Every associative algebra $(A,\cdot)$ has an $A_\infty$-infinity structure by defining $m_2(a,b) = a\cdot b$ and $m_i = 0$ for $i \neq 2$. Hence $A_\infty$-algebras generalize associative algebras.

=== Differential graded algebras ===
Every differential graded algebra $(A^\bullet, d)$ has a canonical structure as an $A_\infty$-algebra where $m_1 = d$ and $m_2$ is the multiplication map. All other higher maps $m_i$ are equal to $0$. Using the structure theorem for minimal models, there is a canonical $A_\infty$-structure on the graded cohomology algebra $HA^\bullet$ which preserves the quasi-isomorphism structure of the original differential graded algebra. One common example of such dga's comes from the Koszul algebra arising from a regular sequence. This is an important result because it helps pave the way for the equivalence of homotopy categories

$\text{Ho}(\text{dga}) \simeq \text{Ho}(A_\infty\text{-alg})$

of differential graded algebras and $A_\infty$-algebras.

=== Cochain algebras of H-spaces ===
One of the motivating examples of $A_\infty$-algebras comes from the study of H-spaces. Whenever a topological space $X$ is an H-space, its associated singular chain complex $C_*(X)$ has a canonical $A_\infty$-algebra structure from its structure as an H-space.

=== Example with infinitely many non-trivial m_{i} ===
Consider the graded algebra $V^\bullet = V_0\oplus V_1$ over a field $k$ of characteristic $0$ where $V_0$ is spanned by the degree $0$ vectors $v_1,v_2$ and $V_1$ is spanned by the degree $1$ vector $w$. Even in this simple example there is a non-trivial $A_\infty$-structure which gives differentials in all possible degrees. This is partially due to the fact there is a degree $1$ vector, giving a degree $k$ vector space of rank $1$ in $(V^\bullet)^{\otimes k}$. Define the differential $m_1$ by

$$\begin{align}
m_1(v_0) = w \\
m_1(v_1) = w,
\end{align}$$

and for $d \geq 2$

$$\begin{align}
m_d(v_1\otimes w^{\otimes k}\otimes v_1\otimes w^{\otimes (d-2)-k}) &=(-1)^ks_dv_1 & 0 \leq k \leq d-2 \\
m_d(v_1\otimes w^{\otimes (d-2)}\otimes v_2)&= s_{d+1}v_1 \\
m_d(v_1\otimes w^{\otimes (d-1)}) &= s_{d+1}w,
\end{align}$$

where $m_n = 0$ on any map not listed above and $s_n = (-1)^{(n-1)(n-2)/2}$. In degree $d=2$, so for the multiplication map, we have
$$\begin{align}
m_2(v_1,v_1)&= -v_1 \\
m_2(v_1,v_2)&= v_1 \\
m_2(v_1,w)&= w.
\end{align}$$
And in $d=3$ the above relations give

$$\begin{align}
m_3(v_1,v_1,w) &= v_1 \\
m_3(v_1,w,v_1) &= -v_1 \\
m_3(v_1,w,v_2) &= -v_1 \\
m_3(v_1,w,w) &= -w.
\end{align}$$

When relating these equations to the failure for associativity, there exist non-zero terms. For example, the coherence conditions for $v_1,v_2,w$ will give a non-trivial example where associativity doesn't hold on the nose. Note that in the cohomology algebra $H^*(V^\bullet, [m_2])$ we have only the degree $0$ terms $v_1,v_2$ since $w$ is killed by the differential $m_1$.

== Properties ==
=== Transfer of A∞ structure ===
One of the key properties of $A_\infty$-algebras is their structure can be transferred to other algebraic objects given the correct hypotheses. An early rendition of this property was the following: Given an $A_\infty$-algebra $A^\bullet$ and a homotopy equivalence of complexes

$$f\colon B^\bullet \to A^\bullet$$,

then there is an $A_\infty$-algebra structure on $B^\bullet$ inherited from $A^\bullet$ and $f$ can be extended to a morphism of $A_\infty$-algebras. There are multiple theorems of this flavor with different hypotheses on $B^\bullet$ and $f$, some of which have stronger results, such as uniqueness up to homotopy for the structure on $B^\bullet$ and strictness on the map $f$.

== Structure ==
=== Minimal models and Kadeishvili's theorem ===
One of the important structure theorems for $A_\infty$-algebras is the existence and uniqueness of minimal models – which are defined as $A_\infty$-algebras where the differential map $m_1 = 0$ is zero. Taking the cohomology algebra $HA^\bullet$ of an $A_\infty$-algebra $A^\bullet$ from the differential $m_1$, so as a graded algebra,

$$HA^\bullet = \frac{\text{ker}(m_1)}{m_1(A^\bullet)}$$,

with multiplication map $[m_2]$. It turns out this graded algebra can then canonically be equipped with an $A_\infty$-structure,

$$(HA^\bullet, 0, [m_2], m_3,m_4,\ldots)$$,

which is unique up-to quasi-isomorphisms of $A_\infty$-algebras. In fact, the statement is even stronger: there is a canonical $A_\infty$-morphism

$$(HA^\bullet, 0, [m_2], m_3,m_4,\ldots) \to A^\bullet$$,

which lifts the identity map of $A^\bullet$. Note these higher products are given by the Massey product.

==== Motivation ====
This theorem is very important for the study of differential graded algebras because they were originally introduced to study the homotopy theory of rings. Since the cohomology operation kills the homotopy information, and not every differential graded algebra is quasi-isomorphic to its cohomology algebra, information is lost by taking this operation. But, the minimal models let you recover the quasi-isomorphism class while still forgetting the differential. There is an analogous result for A∞-categories by Maxim Kontsevich and Yan Soibelman, giving an A∞-category structure on the cohomology category $H^*(D^b_\infty(X))$ of the dg-category consisting of cochain complexes of coherent sheaves on a non-singular variety $X$ over a field $k$ of characteristic $0$ and morphisms given by the total complex of the Čech bi-complex of the differential graded sheaf $\mathcal{Hom}^\bullet(\mathcal{F}^\bullet,\mathcal{G}^\bullet)$^{pg 586-593}. In this was, the degree $k$ morphisms in the category $H^*(D^b_\infty(X))$ are given by $\text{Ext}(\mathcal{F}^\bullet,\mathcal{G}^\bullet)$.

==== Applications ====
There are several applications of this theorem. In particular, given a dg-algebra, such as the de Rham algebra $(\Omega^\bullet(X),d,\wedge)$, or the Hochschild cohomology algebra, they can be equipped with an $A_\infty$-structure.

=== Massey structure from DGA's ===
Given a differential graded algebra $(A^\bullet, d)$ its minimal model as an $A_\infty$-algebra $(HA^\bullet, 0, [m_2], m_3,m_4,\ldots)$ is constructed using the Massey products. That is,

$$\begin{align}
m_3(x_3,x_2,x_1) &= \langle x_3,x_2,x_1 \rangle \\
m_4(x_4,x_3,x_2,x_1) &= \langle x_4, x_3,x_2,x_1 \rangle \\
&\cdots &
\end{align}$$

It turns out that any $A_\infty$-algebra structure on $HA^\bullet$ is closely related to this construction. Given another $A_\infty$-structure on $HA^\bullet$ with maps $m_i'$, there is the relation

$$m_n(x_1,\ldots,x_n) = \langle x_1,\ldots, x_n\rangle + \Gamma$$,

where

$$\Gamma \in \sum_{j=1}^{n-1} \text{Im}(m_j)$$.

Hence all such $A_\infty$-enrichments on the cohomology algebra are related to one another.

=== Graded algebras from its ext algebra ===
Another structure theorem is the reconstruction of an algebra from its ext algebra. Given a connected graded algebra

$$A = k_A \oplus A_1 \oplus A_2 \oplus \cdots$$,

it is canonically an associative algebra. There is an associated algebra, called its Ext algebra, defined as

$$\operatorname{Ext}_A^\bullet(k_A,k_A)$$,

where multiplication is given by the Yoneda product. Then, there is an $A_\infty$-quasi-isomorphism between $(A,0,m_2,0,\ldots)$ and $\operatorname{Ext}_A^\bullet(k_A,k_A)$. This identification is important because it gives a way to show that all derived categories are derived affine, meaning they are isomorphic to the derived category of some algebra.

== See also ==
- A∞-category
- Associahedron
- Mirror symmetry conjecture
- Homological mirror symmetry
- Homotopy Lie algebra
- Derived algebraic geometry
