= Lawvere–Tierney topology =

Analog of Grothendieck topology

In mathematics, a Lawvere–Tierney topology is an analog of a Grothendieck topology for an arbitrary elementary topos, used to construct a topos of sheaves. A Lawvere–Tierney topology is also sometimes also called a local operator or coverage or topology or geometric modality. They were introduced by William Lawvere (1971) and Myles Tierney.

== Definition ==
If E is a topos, then a topology on E is a morphism j from the subobject classifier Ω to Ω such that j preserves truth ($j \circ \mbox{true} = \mbox{true}$), preserves intersections ($j \circ \wedge = \wedge \circ (j \times j)$), and is idempotent ($j \circ j = j$).

== j-closure ==
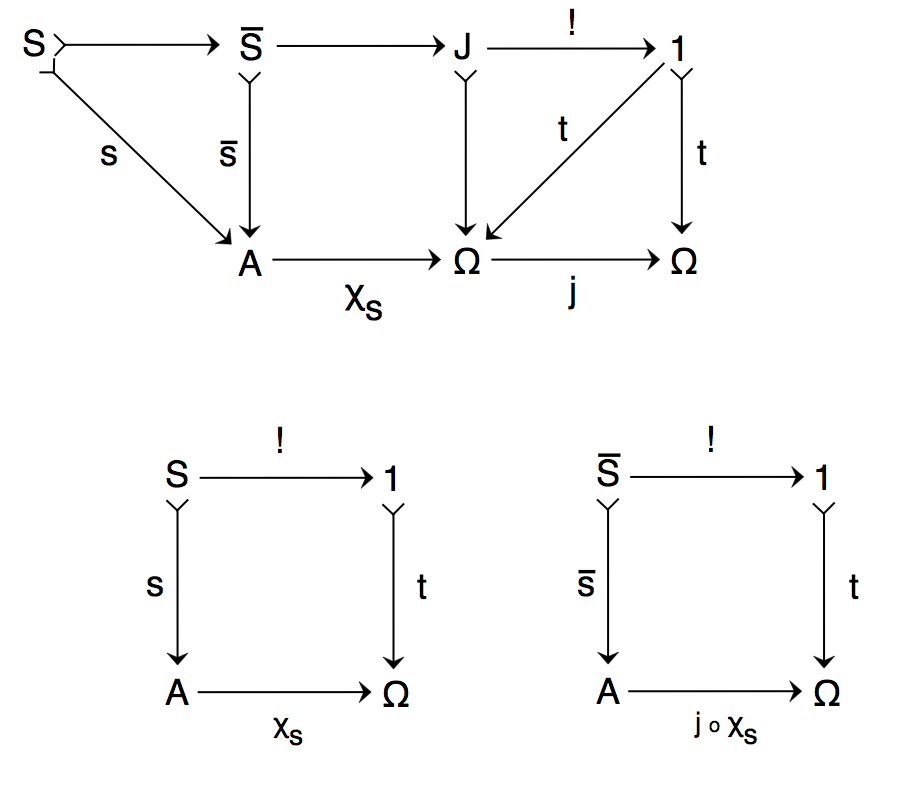
Commutative diagrams showing how j-closure operates. Ω and t are the subobject classifier. χ_{s} is the characteristic morphism of s as a subobject of A and $j \circ \chi_s$ is the characteristic morphism of $\bar s$ which is the j-closure of s. The bottom two squares are pullback squares and they are contained in the top diagram as well: the first one as a trapezoid and the second one as a two-square rectangle.

Given a subobject $s:S \rightarrowtail A$ of an object A with classifier $\chi_s:A \rightarrow \Omega$, then the composition $j \circ \chi_s$ defines another subobject $\bar s:\bar S \rightarrowtail A$ of A such that s is a subobject of $\bar s$, and $\bar s$ is said to be the j-closure of s.

Some theorems related to j-closure are (for some subobjects s and w of A):

- inflationary property: $s \subseteq \bar s$
- idempotence: $\bar s \equiv \bar \bar s$
- preservation of intersections: $\overline{s \cap w} \equiv \bar s \cap \bar w$
- preservation of order: $s \subseteq w \Longrightarrow \bar s \subseteq \bar w$
- stability under pullback: $\overline{f^{-1}(s)} \equiv f^{-1}(\bar s)$.

== Examples ==
- Grothendieck topologies on a small category C are essentially the same as Lawvere–Tierney topologies on the topos of presheaves of sets over C.
- Lawvere–Tierney topologies on the effective topos generalize the notion of an oracle in computability theory.

== Internal point of view ==
The statement that a morphism $j : \Omega \to \Omega$ is a Lawvere–Tierney topology can be expressed purely in the internal language of the elementary topos. Indeed, a rephrasing of the definition is that $j$ is a Lawvere–Tierney topology when the following three conditions are satisfied internally:

1. $j(\top) = \top$
2. $\forall \, p : \Omega, j(j(p)) \Leftrightarrow j(p)$
3. $\forall \, p \, q : \Omega, j(p \land q) \Leftrightarrow j(p) \land j(q)$

An equivalent definition uses the following three conditions instead:

1. $\forall \, p \, q : \Omega, (p \Rightarrow q) \Rightarrow (j(p) \Rightarrow j(q))$
2. $\forall \, p : \Omega, p \Rightarrow j(p)$
3. $\forall \, p : \Omega, j(j(p)) \Rightarrow j(p)$

This reveals that a Lawvere–Tierney topology is the same as a monad on the set of truth values $\Omega$ partially ordered by implication, viewed as a posetal category. In particular, another equivalent definition is by the following conditions, which follow the standard convention of defining monads in functional programming by the ret and bind operators:

1. $\forall \, p : \Omega, p \Rightarrow j(p)$
2. $\forall \, p \, q : \Omega, (p \Rightarrow j(q)) \Rightarrow (j(p) \Rightarrow j(q))$

The second condition can be informally stated as: to prove a proposition of the form $j(q)$, one can without loss of generality replace any hypothesis $j(p)$ with just $p$.
