= Opetope =

Polytope of operations

In category theory, a branch of mathematics, an opetope, a portmanteau of "operation" and "polytope", is a shape that captures higher-dimensional substitutions. It was introduced by John C. Baez and James Dolan so that they could define a weak n-category as a certain presheaf on the category of opetopes.

== See also ==
- higher-order operad
