= Algebraic homotopy =

In mathematics, algebraic homotopy is a research program on homotopy theory proposed by J.H.C. Whitehead in his 1950 ICM talk, where he described it as:

The ultimate object of algebraic homotopy is to construct a purely algebraic theory, which is equivalent to homotopy theory in the same sort of way that 'analytic' is equivalent to 'pure' projective geometry.

In spirit, the program is somehow similar to Grothendieck's homotopy hypothesis. However, according to Ronnie Brown, "Looking again at Esquisses d'un Progamme, it seems that programme has currently little relation to Whitehead's."
