= Nonabelian cohomology =

In mathematics, a nonabelian cohomology is any cohomology with coefficients in a nonabelian group, a sheaf of nonabelian groups or even in a topological space.

If homology is thought of as the abelianization of homotopy (cf. Hurewicz theorem), then the nonabelian cohomology may be thought of as a dual of homotopy groups.

== Nonabelian Poincaré duality ==
See: Nonabelian Poincare Duality (Lecture 8)

== See also ==
- Stacks
- Group cohomology
