= Vladimir Turaev =

Russian mathematician (born 1954)

Vladimir Georgievich Turaev (Владимир Георгиевич Тураев, born in 1954) is a Russian mathematician, specializing in topology.

Turaev received in 1979 from the Steklov Institute of Mathematics his Candidate of Sciences degree (PhD) under Oleg Viro. Turaev was a professor at the University of Strasbourg and then became a professor at Indiana University. In 2016, he was elected a Fellow of the American Mathematical Society.

Turaev's research deals with low-dimensional topology, quantum topology, and knot theory and their interconnections with quantum field theory. In 1991, Reshetikhin and Turaev published a mathematical construction of new topological invariants of compact oriented 3-manifolds and framed links in these manifolds, corresponding to a mathematical implementation of ideas in quantum field theory published by Witten; the invariants are now called Witten-Reshetikhin-Turaev (or Reshetikhin-Turaev) invariants. In 1992, Turaev and Viro introduced a new family of invariants for 3-manifolds by using state sums computed on triangulations of manifolds; these invariants are now called Turaev-Viro invariants.

In 1990, Turaev was an Invited Speaker with talk State sum models in low dimensional topology at the ICM in Kyōto. In 2016, he shared, with Alexis Virelizier, the Ferran Sunyer i Balaguer Prize for their monograph Monoidal categories and topological field theory.

== Selected publications ==
=== Articles ===
- Turaev, V. G. (1988). "The Yang-Baxter equation and invariants of links". Inventiones Mathematicae. 92 (3): 527–553. Bibcode:1988InMat..92..527T. doi:10.1007/BF01393746. S2CID 122703873.
- with Nicolai Reshetikhin: Reshetikhin, N. Y.; Turaev, V. G. (1990). "Ribbon graphs and their invariants derived from quantum groups". Communications in Mathematical Physics. 127 (1): 1–26. Bibcode:1990CMaPh.127....1R. doi:10.1007/BF02096491. S2CID 122572484.
- Turaev, Vladimir G. (1991). "Skein quantization of Poisson algebras of loops on surfaces". Annales Scientifiques de l'École Normale Supérieure. 24 (6): 635–704. doi:10.24033/asens.1639.

=== Books ===
- Quantum invariants of Knots and 3-Manifolds, de Gruyter 1994; 2nd edition. 2010.; Turaev, Vladimir G. (2016). 3rd edition. Walter de Gruyter GmbH & Co KG. ISBN 9783110435221.
- with Christian Kassel and Marc Rosso: Quantum groups and knot invariants, SMF (Panoramas et Synthèses) 1997
- as editor with Anatoly Vershik: Topology, ergodic theory, real algebraic geometry - Rokhlin´s memorial, American Mathematical Society 2001
- Introduction to combinatorial torsions, Birkhäuser 2001
- Torsions of 3-dimensional manifolds, Birkhäuser 2002
- with Christian Kassel: Braid Groups, Springer 2008, ISBN 0-387-33841-1
- Homotopy quantum field theory, European Mathematical Society 2010
- with Alexis Virelizier: Monoidal Categories and Topological Field Theory, Birkhäuser 2015

== See also ==
- Reshetikhin–Turaev invariant
