= Jean Bénabou =

French mathematician (1932–2022)

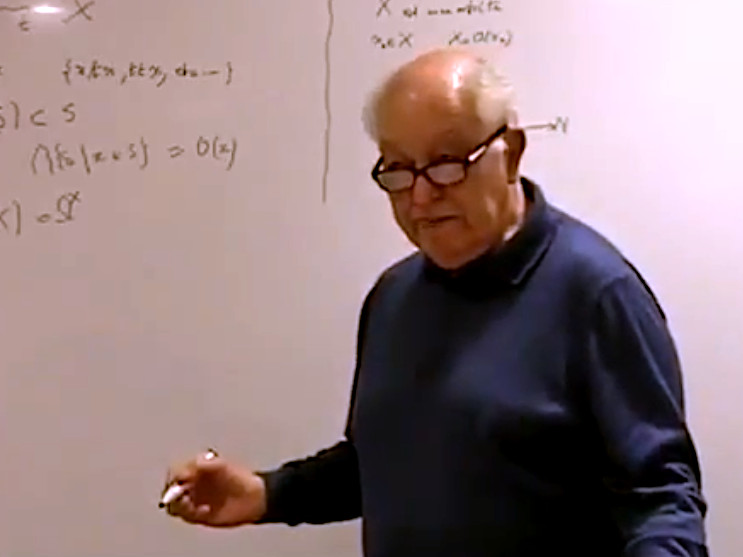
- Jean Bénabou in Paris, in 2015.
- Born: 1932; Rabat, French Protectorate in Morocco, France
- Died: 11 February 2022 (aged 89–90); France
- Education: University of Paris
- Relatives: Marcel Bénabou (cousin)
- Scientific career
- Thesis: Structures algebriques dans les categories (1966)
- Doctoral advisor: Charles Ehresmann

Jean Bénabou (1932 – 11 February 2022) was a French mathematician, known for his contributions to category theory. He directed the Research Seminar in Category Theory at the Institut Henri Poincaré and Institut de mathématiques de Jussieu from 1969 to 2001.

== Partial bibliography ==
- Bénabou, Jean (1963). "Catégories avec multiplication". Comptes Rendus de l'Académie des Sciences (in French). 256: 1887–1890.
- Bénabou, Jean (1967). "Introduction to bicategories". Reports of the Midwest Category Seminar. Lecture Notes in Mathematics. Vol. 47. Berlin: Springer. pp. 1–77. doi:10.1007/BFb0074299. ISBN 978-3-540-03918-1.
- Bénabou, Jean (1968). "Structures algébriques dans les catégories" (PDF). Cahiers de Topologie et Géométrie Différentielle Catégoriques. 10 (1): 1–126.
- Bénabou, Jean; Roubaud, Jacques (1970). "Monades et descente". Comptes Rendus de l'Académie des Sciences, Série A (in French) (270): 96–98.
- Bénabou, Jean (1973). "Les distributeurs". Séminaires de mathématique pure (in French). 33. Université Catholique de Louvain.
- Bénabou, Jean (1985). "Fibered categories and the foundations of naive category theory". Journal of Symbolic Logic. 50 (1): 10–37. doi:10.2307/2273784. JSTOR 2273784. S2CID 18310794.
