= Homotopical algebra =

Branch of mathematics

In mathematics, homotopical algebra is a collection of concepts comprising the nonabelian aspects of homological algebra, and possibly the abelian aspects as special cases. The homotopical nomenclature stems from the fact that a common approach to such generalizations is via abstract homotopy theory, as in nonabelian algebraic topology, and in particular the theory of closed model categories.

This subject has received much attention in recent years due to new foundational work of Vladimir Voevodsky, Eric Friedlander, Andrei Suslin, and others resulting in the A^{1} homotopy theory for quasiprojective varieties over a field. Voevodsky has used this new algebraic homotopy theory to prove the Milnor conjecture (for which he was awarded the Fields Medal) and later, in collaboration with Markus Rost, the full Bloch–Kato conjecture.

== See also ==
- Derived algebraic geometry
- Derivator
- Cotangent complex - one of the first objects discovered using homotopical algebra
- L_{∞} Algebra
- A_{∞} Algebra
- Categorical algebra
- Nonabelian homological algebra
