= André Joyal =

Canadian mathematician

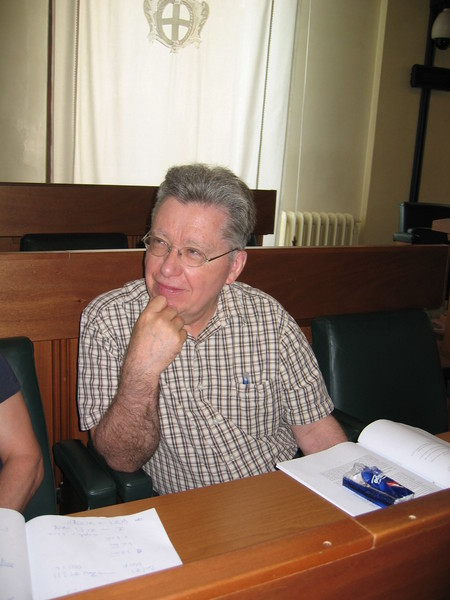
- Born: February 25, 1943 (age 83); Drummondville, Quebec, Canada
- Known for: Quasi-categories; Combinatorial species Joyal model structure Kripke–Joyal semantics
- Scientific career
- Fields: Category theory Homotopy theory
- Workplaces: Université du Québec à Montréal

André Joyal (French: [ʒwajal]; born 1943) is a professor of mathematics at the Université du Québec à Montréal who works on category theory. He was a member of the School of Mathematics at the Institute for Advanced Study in 2013, where he was invited to join the Special Year on Univalent Foundations of Mathematics.

== Research ==
He discovered Kripke–Joyal semantics, the theory of combinatorial species and with Myles Tierney a generalization of the Galois theory of Alexander Grothendieck in the setup of locales. Most of his research is in some way related to category theory, higher category theory and their applications. He did some work on quasi-categories, after their invention by Michael Boardman and Rainer Vogt, in particular conjecturing and proving the existence of a Quillen model structure on the category of simplicial sets whose weak equivalences generalize both equivalence of categories and Kan equivalence of spaces, which is now known as Joyal model structure. He co-authored the book "Algebraic Set Theory" with Ieke Moerdijk and recently started a web-based expositional project Joyal's CatLab on categorical mathematics.

== Bibliography ==
- Joyal, André; Tierney, Myles (1984). "An extension of the Galois theory of Grothendieck". Memoirs of the American Mathematical Society. 51 (309). doi:10.1090/memo/0309. MR 0756176.
- Joyal, A. (2002). "Quasi-categories and Kan complexes, (in Special volume celebrating the 70th birthday of Prof. Max Kelly)". Journal of Pure and Applied Algebra. 175 (1–3): 207–222. doi:10.1016/S0022-4049(02)00135-4.
- Joyal, André; Tierney, Myles (2007). "Quasi-categories vs Segal spaces". Categories in Algebra, Geometry and Mathematical Physics. Contemporary Mathematics. Vol. 431. pp. 277–326. arXiv:math/0607820. doi:10.1090/conm/431/08278. ISBN 9780821839706. MR 2342834. S2CID 119749421.
- Joyal, André; Tierney, Myles (2000). "On the theory of path groupoids". Journal of Pure and Applied Algebra. 149: 69–100. doi:10.1016/S0022-4049(98)00164-9.
- Joyal, André; Street, Ross (1993). "Pullbacks equivalent to pseudopullbacks" (PDF). Cahiers de Topologie et Géométrie Différentielle Catégoriques. 34 (2): 153–156. MR 1223657.
- Joyal, André; Tierney, Myles (1991). "Strong stacks and classifying spaces". Category Theory. Lecture Notes in Mathematics. Vol. 1488. pp. 213–236. doi:10.1007/BFb0084222. ISBN 978-3-540-54706-8.
- Joyal, André; Street, Ross (1991). "An introduction to Tannaka duality and quantum groups" (PDF). Category Theory. Lecture Notes in Mathematics. Vol. 1488. pp. 413–492. doi:10.1007/BFb0084235. ISBN 978-3-540-54706-8.
- Joyal, André; Street, Ross (1991). "The geometry of tensor calculus, I". Advances in Mathematics. 88: 55–112. doi:10.1016/0001-8708(91)90003-P.; Joyal, A.; Street, R. (1993). "Braided Tensor Categories". Advances in Mathematics. 102: 20–78. doi:10.1006/aima.1993.1055.; Joyal, André; Street, Ross (1991). "Tortile Yang-Baxter operators in tensor categories". Journal of Pure and Applied Algebra. 71: 43–51. doi:10.1016/0022-4049(91)90039-5.
- Joyal, André; Street, Ross; Verity, Dominic (1996). "Traced monoidal categories". Mathematical Proceedings of the Cambridge Philosophical Society. 119 (3): 447–468. doi:10.1017/S0305004100074338. S2CID 50511333.
- André Joyal, Ieke Moerdijk, Algebraic set theory. London Mathematical Society Lecture Note Series 220. Cambridge Univ. Press 1995. viii+123 pp. ISBN 0-521-55830-1
- André Joyal, Myles Tierney, Notes on simplicial homotopy theory, CRM Barcelona, Jan 2008 pdf
- André Joyal, Disks, duality and theta-categories, preprint (1997) (contains an original definition of a weak n-category: for a short account see Leinster's arXiv:math.CT/0305049, 10.2).

== See also ==
- Joyal's theorem
- Joyal's theta category
