= Derivator =

In mathematics, derivators are a proposed framework^{pg 190-195} for homological algebra giving a foundation for both abelian and non-abelian homological algebra and various generalizations of it. They were introduced to address the deficiencies of derived categories (such as the non-functoriality of the cone construction) and provide at the same time a language for homotopical algebra.

Derivators were first introduced by Alexander Grothendieck in his long unpublished 1983 manuscript Pursuing Stacks. They were then further developed by him in the huge unpublished 1991 manuscript Les Dérivateurs of almost 2000 pages. Essentially the same concept was introduced (apparently independently) by Alex Heller.

The manuscript has been edited for on-line publication by Georges Maltsiniotis. The theory has been further developed by several other people, including Heller, Franke, Keller and Groth.

== Motivations ==
One of the motivating reasons for considering derivators is the lack of functoriality with the cone construction with triangulated categories. Derivators are able to solve this problem, and solve the inclusion of general homotopy colimits, by keeping track of all possible diagrams in a category with weak equivalences and their relations between each other. Heuristically, given the diagram

$\bullet \to \bullet$

which is a category with two objects and one non-identity arrow, and a functor

$F:(\bullet \to \bullet) \to A$

to a category $A$ with a class of weak-equivalences $W$ (and satisfying the right hypotheses), we should have an associated functor

$C(F): \bullet \to A[W^{-1}]$

where the target object is unique up to weak equivalence in $A[W^{-1}]$. Derivators are able to encode this kind of information and provide a diagram calculus to use in derived categories and homotopy theory.

== Definition ==
=== Prederivators ===
Formally, a prederivator $\mathbb{D}$ is a 2-functor

$\mathbb{D}: \text{Ind}^{op} \to \text{CAT}$

from a suitable 2-category of indices to the category of categories. Typically such 2-functors come from considering the categories $\underline{\text{Hom}}(I^{op}, A)$ where $A$ is called the category of coefficients. For example, $\text{Ind}$ could be the category of small categories which are filtered, whose objects can be thought of as the indexing sets for a filtered colimit. Then, given a morphism of diagrams

$f:I \to J$

denote $f^*$ by

$f^*:\mathbb{D}(J) \to \mathbb{D}(I)$

This is called the inverse image functor. In the motivating example, this is just precompositition, so given a functor $F_I \in \underline{\text{Hom}}(I^{op}, A)$ there is an associated functor $F_J = F_I \circ f$. Note these 2-functors could be taken to be

$\underline{\text{Hom}}(-,A[W^{-1}])$

where $W$ is a suitable class of weak equivalences in a category $A$.

==== Indexing categories ====
There are a number of examples of indexing categories which can be used in this construction

- The 2-category $\text{FinCat}$ of finite categories, so the objects are categories whose collection of objects are finite sets.
- The ordinal category $\Delta$ can be categorified into a two category, where the objects are categories with one object, and the functors come from the arrows in the ordinal category.
- Another option is to just use the category of small categories.
- In addition, associated to any topological space $X$ is a category $\text{Open}(X)$ which could be used as the indexing category.
- Moreover, the sites underlying the Zariski, Etale, etc., Grothendieck topoi of $(X)_\tau$ for some scheme or algebraic space $X$ along with their morphisms can be used for the indexing category
- This can be generalized to any topos $T$, so the indexing category is the underlying site.

=== Derivators ===
Derivators are then the axiomatization of prederivators which come equipped with adjoint functors

$$f^? \dashv f_! \dashv f^* \dashv f_* \dashv f^!$$

where $f_!$ is left adjoint to $f^*$ and so on. Heuristically, $f_*$ should correspond to inverse limits, $f_!$ to colimits.

== Bibliography ==
- Grothendieck, Alexander (1991). Maltsiniotis, Georges; Malgoire, Jean; Künzer, Matthias (eds.). "Les Dérivateurs: Texte d'Alexandre Grothendieck".
- Heller, Alex (1988). "Homotopy theories". Memoirs of the American Mathematical Society. 71 (383). Providence, RI: Amer. Math. Soc. doi:10.1090/memo/0383. ISBN 978-0-8218-2446-7.
- Groth, Moritz (2013). "Derivators, pointed derivators, and stable derivators". Algebr. Geom. Topol. 13: 313–374. arXiv:1112.3840. doi:10.2140/agt.2013.13.313. S2CID 62898638.
