= Reshetikhin–Turaev invariant =

Family of quantum invariants

In the mathematical field of quantum topology, the Reshetikhin–Turaev invariants (RT-invariants) are a family of quantum invariants of framed links. Such invariants of framed links also give rise to invariants of 3-manifolds via the Dehn surgery construction. These invariants were discovered by Nicolai Reshetikhin and Vladimir Turaev in 1991, and were meant to be a mathematical realization of Witten's proposed invariants of links and 3-manifolds using quantum field theory.

== Overview ==
To obtain an RT-invariant, one must first have a $\Bbbk$-linear ribbon category at hand. Each $\Bbbk$-linear ribbon category comes equipped with a diagrammatic calculus in which morphisms are represented by certain decorated framed tangle diagrams, where the initial and terminal objects are represented by the boundary components of the tangle. In this calculus, a (decorated framed) link diagram $L$, being a (decorated framed) tangle without boundary, represents an endomorphism of the monoidal identity (the empty set in this calculus), or in other words, an element of $\Bbbk$. This element of $\Bbbk$ is the RT-invariant associated to $L$. Given any closed oriented 3-manifold $M$, there exists a framed link $L$ in the 3-sphere $S^3$ so that $M$ is homeomorphic to the manifold $M_L$ obtained by surgering $S^3$ along $L$. Two such manifolds $M_L$ and $M_{L^\prime}$ are homeomorphic if and only if $L$ and $L^\prime$ are related by a sequence of Kirby moves. Reshetikhin and Turaev used this idea to construct invariants of 3-manifolds by combining certain RT-invariants into an expression which is invariant under Kirby moves. Such invariants of 3-manifolds are known as Witten–Reshetikhin–Turaev invariants (WRT-invariants).

== Examples ==
Let $A$ be a ribbon Hopf algebra over a field $\Bbbk$ (one can take, for example, any quantum group over $\mathbb{C}$). Consider the category $\textbf{Rep}^{\text{f.d.}}(A)$, of finite dimensional representations of $A$. There is a diagrammatic calculus in which morphisms in $\textbf{Rep}^{\text{f.d.}}(A)$ are represented by framed tangle diagrams with each connected component decorated by a finite dimensional representation of $A$. That is, $\textbf{Rep}^{\text{f.d.}}(A)$ is a $\Bbbk$-linear ribbon category. In this way, each ribbon Hopf algebra $A$ gives rise to an invariant of framed links colored by representations of $A$ (an RT-invariant).

For the quantum group $A=U_q(\mathfrak{sl}_2(\mathbb{C}))$ over the field $\mathbb{C}(q)$, the corresponding RT-invariant for links and 3-manifolds gives rise to the following family of link invariants, appearing in skein theory. Let $L$ be a framed link in $S^3$ with $m$ components. For each $r\in\mathbb{N}$, let $\text{RT}_r(S^3, L)$ denote the RT-invariant obtained by decorating each component of $L$ by the unique $N+1$-dimensional representation of $A$. Then

$$\operatorname{RT}_r(S^3,L) = \langle e_n, e_n, \dots, e_n \rangle_L \in\mathbb{C}(q)$$

where the $m$-tuple, $\langle e_n, e_n, \dots, e_n \rangle_L$ denotes the Kauffman polynomial of the link $L$, where each of the $m$ components is cabled by the Jones–Wenzl idempotent $e_n$, a special element of the Temperley–Lieb algebra.

To define the corresponding WRT-invariant for 3-manifolds, first of all we choose $t$ to be either a $2r$-th root of unity or an $r$-th root of unity with odd $r$. Assume that $M_L$ is obtained by doing Dehn surgery on a framed link $L$. Then the RT-invariant for the 3-manifold $M$ is defined to be

$$\operatorname{RT}_r(M_L)  = \langle \omega_r \rangle_{O^+}^{b_-} \langle \omega_r \rangle_{O^-}^{b_+} \langle \omega_r, \omega_r, \dots, \omega_r \rangle_L (t)\in \mathbb{C},$$

where $\omega_r = \sum_{n=0}^{r-2} \langle e_n \rangle_{O} e_n$ is the Kirby coloring, $O^\pm$ are the unknot with $\pm 1$ framing, and $b_\pm$ are the numbers of positive and negative eigenvalues for the linking matrix of $L$ respectively. Roughly speaking, the first and second bracket ensure that $\text{RT}_r(M_L)$ is invariant under blowing up/down (first Kirby move) and the third bracket ensures that $\text{RT}_r(M_L)$ is invariant under handle sliding (second Kirby move).

== Properties ==
The Witten–Reshetikhin–Turaev invariants for 3-manifolds satisfy the following properties:

1. $\text{RT}_r(M\#N) = \text{RT}_r(M)\text{RT}_r(N),$ where $M\# N$ denotes the connected sum of $M$ and $N$
2. $\operatorname{RT}_r(-M)=\overline{\text{RT}_r(M)},$ where $-M$ is the manifold $M$ with opposite orientation, and $\overline{\text{RT}_r(M)}$ denotes the complex conjugate of $\operatorname{RT}_r(M)$
3. $\operatorname{RT}_r(S^3)=1$

These three properties coincide with the properties satisfied by the 3-manifold invariants defined by Witten using Chern–Simons theory (under certain normalization).

== Open problems ==
=== Witten's asymptotic expansion conjecture ===
Pick $t = e^{\frac{\pi i}{r}}$. Witten's asymptotic expansion conjecture suggests that for every 3-manifold $M$, the large $r$-th asymptotics of $\text{RT}_r(M)$ is governed by the contributions of flat connections.

Conjecture: There exists constants $d_j \in \mathbb{Q}$ and $b_j \in \mathbb{C}$ (depending on $M$) for $j = 0,1, \dots, n$ and $a^l_j \in \mathbb{C}$ for $j=0,1,\dots, n, l=1,2,\dots$ such that the asymptotic expansion of $\text{RT}_r(M)$ in the limit $r \to \infty$ is given by

$$\operatorname{RT}_r(M) \sim \sum_{j=0}^n e^{2\pi i r q_j} r^{d_j} b_j \left( 1 + \sum_{\ell=1}^\infty a^\ell_j r^{-\ell} \right)$$

where $q_0 = 0, q_1,\dots q_n$ are the finitely many different values of the Chern–Simons functional on the space of flat $\text{SU}(2)$-connections on $M$.

=== Volume conjecture for the Reshetikhin–Turaev invariant ===
Witten's asymptotic expansion conjecture suggests that at $t =e^{{\pi i}/{r}}$, the RT-invariants grow polynomially in $r$. On the contrary, at $t=e^{{2\pi i}/{r}}$ with odd $r$, in 2018 Q. Chen and T. Yang suggested the volume conjecture for the RT-invariants, which essentially says that the RT-invariants for hyperbolic 3-manifolds grow exponentially in $r$ and the growth rate gives the hyperbolic volume and Chern–Simons invariants for the 3-manifold.

Conjecture: Let $M$ be a closed oriented hyperbolic 3-manifold. Then for a suitable choice of arguments,

$$\lim_{r\to \infty} \frac{4\pi}{r} \log \left(\operatorname{RT}_r \big(M,e^{{2\pi i}/{r}}\big)\right) = \operatorname{Vol}(M) - i \operatorname{CS}(M) \mod \pi^2 i\mathbb{Z}$$

where $r$ is odd positive integer.
