= Pursuing Stacks =

Seminal math text

Pursuing Stacks (French: À la Poursuite des Champs) is an influential 1983 mathematical manuscript by Alexander Grothendieck. It consists of a 12-page letter to Daniel Quillen followed by about 600 pages of research notes.

The topic of the work is a generalized homotopy theory using higher category theory. The word "stacks" in the title refers to what are nowadays usually called "∞-groupoids", one possible definition of which Grothendieck sketches in his manuscript. (The stacks of algebraic geometry, which also go back to Grothendieck, are not the focus of this manuscript.) Among the concepts introduced in the work are derivators and test categories.

Some parts of the manuscript were later developed in:

- Georges Maltsiniotis (2005), "La théorie de l'homotopie de Grothendieck" [Grothendieck's homotopy theory] (PDF), Astérisque, 301, MR 2200690
- Denis-Charles Cisinski (2006), "Les préfaisceaux comme modèles des types d'homotopie" [Presheaves as models for homotopy types] (PDF), Astérisque, vol. 308, ISBN 978-2-85629-225-9, MR 2294028

== Overview of manuscript ==
=== I. The letter to Daniel Quillen ===
Pursuing stacks started out as a letter from Grothendieck to Daniel Quillen. In this letter he discusses Quillen's progress on the foundations for homotopy theory and remarked on the lack of progress since then. He remarks how some of his friends at Bangor university, including Ronald Brown, were studying higher fundamental groupoids $\Pi_n(X)$ for a topological space $X$ and how the foundations for such a topic could be laid down and relativized using topos theory making way for higher gerbes. Moreover, he was critical of using strict groupoids for laying down these foundations since they would not be sufficient for developing the full theory he envisioned.

He laid down his ideas of what such an ∞-groupoid should look like, and gave some axioms sketching out how he envisioned them. Essentially, they are categories with objects, arrows, arrows between arrows, and so on, analogous to the situation for higher homotopies. It's conjectured this could be accomplished by looking at a successive sequence of categories and functors

$C_0 \to C_1 \to \cdots \to C_n \to C_{n+1} \to \cdots$

that are universal with respect to any kind of higher groupoid. This allows for an inductive definition of an ∞-groupoid that depends on the objects $C_0$ and the inclusion functors $C_n \to C_{n+1}$, where the categories $C_n$ keep track of the higher homotopical information up to level $n$. Such a structure was later called a coherator since it keeps track of all higher coherences. This structure has been formally studied by George Malsiniotis making some progress on setting up these foundations and showing the homotopy hypothesis.

=== II. Test categories and test functors ===
==== Grothendieck's motivation for higher stacks ====
As a matter of fact, the description is formally analogous, and nearly identical, to the description of the homology groups of a chain complex – and it would seem therefore that that stacks (more specifically, Gr-stacks) are in a sense the closest possible non-commutative generalization of chain complexes, the homology groups of the chain complex becoming the homotopy groups of the “non-commutative chain complex” or stack. - Grothendieck^{pg 23}

This is later explained by the intuition provided by the Dold–Kan correspondence: simplicial abelian groups correspond to chain complexes of abelian groups, so a higher stack modeled as a simplicial group should correspond to a "non-abelian" chain complex $\mathcal{F}_\bullet$. Moreover, these should have an abelianization given by homology and cohomology, written suggestively as $H^k(X,\mathcal{F}_\bullet)$ or $\mathbf{R}F_*(\mathcal{F}_\bullet)$, since there should be an associated six functor formalism^{pg 24}. Moreover, there should be an associated theory of Lefschetz operations, similar to the thesis of Raynaud.

Because Grothendieck envisioned an alternative formulation of higher stacks using globular groupoids, and observed there should be a corresponding theory using cubical sets, he came up with the idea of test categories and test functors.^{pg 42} Essentially, test categories should be categories $M$ with a class of weak equivalences $W$ such that there is a geometric realization functor

$|\cdot|: M \to \text{Spaces}$

and a weak equivalence

$M[W^{-1}] \simeq \text{Hot}$

where Hot denotes the homotopy category.

== See also ==
- Homotopy hypothesis
- ∞-groupoid
- Derivator
- N-group (category theory)
- Higher stack
