= Michael Boardman =

British mathematician (1938–2021)

- Born: John Michael Boardman; 13 February 1938; Manchester
- Died: 18 March 2021 (aged 83)
- Education: University of Cambridge
- Known for: algebraic topology and Differential geometry and topology
- Scientific career
- Fields: Mathematics
- Workplaces: Johns Hopkins University
- Thesis: On stable homotopy theory and some applications (1965)
- Doctoral advisor: C. T. C. Wall
- Website: mathematics.jhu.edu/directory/j-michael-boardman/

John Michael Boardman (13 February 1938 – 18 March 2021) was a mathematician whose speciality was algebraic and differential topology. He was affiliated with the University of Cambridge, England and the Johns Hopkins University in Baltimore, Maryland. Boardman was most widely known for his construction of the first rigorously correct model of the homotopy category of spectra.

He received his PhD from the University of Cambridge in 1964. His thesis advisor was C. T. C. Wall. In 2012 he became a fellow of the American Mathematical Society. He died on 18 March 2021.

== Selected publications ==
- Boardman, John M. (1967). "Singularities of differentiable maps". Publications Mathématiques de l'IHÉS. 33: 21–57. doi:10.1007/BF02684585. MR 0231390. S2CID 55773382.
- Boardman, John Michael (1999). "Conditionally convergent spectral sequences". Homotopy invariant algebraic structures (Baltimore, MD, 1998). Contemporary Mathematics. Vol. 239. Providence, RI: American Mathematical Society. pp. 49–84. doi:10.1090/conm/239/03597. ISBN 978-0-8218-1057-6. MR 1718076.
