= Myles Tierney =

American mathematician and professor

Myles Tierney (September 1937 – 5 October 2017) was an American mathematician and Professor at Rutgers University who founded the theory of elementary toposes with William Lawvere.

Tierney obtained his B.A. from Brown University in 1959 and his Ph.D. from Columbia University in 1965. His dissertation, On the classifying spaces for K-Theory mod p, was written under the supervision of Samuel Eilenberg. Following positions at Rice University (1965–66) and ETH Zurich (1966–68), he became an associate professor at Rutgers in 1968.

Tierney was named a Fellow of the American Mathematical Society.

== Publications ==
- Myles Tierney, On the Spectrum of a Ringed Topos, Algebra, Topology and Category Theory, (1976) doi:10.1016/B978-0-12-339050-9.50020-1
- André Joyal, Myles Tierney, An extension of the Galois theory of Grothendieck, Memoirs of the American Mathematical Society 51 (1984), no. 309. doi:10.1090/memo/0309 MR0756176
- André Joyal, Myles Tierney, Strong stacks and classifying space, Category theory (Como, 1990), 213—236, Lecture Notes in Math. 1488, Springer 1991.
- André Joyal, Myles Tierney, On the theory of path groupoids, Journal of Pure and Applied Algebra 149 (2000), no. 1, 69—100, doi:10.1016/S0022-4049(98)00164-9.
- André Joyal, Myles Tierney, Quasi-categories vs Segal spaces, Categories in algebra, geometry and mathematical physics, 277—326, Contemporary Mathematics 431, American Mathematical Society, Providence, RI, 2007.

== See also ==
- Lawvere–Tierney topology
