= Nicolai Reshetikhin =

Russian mathematician (born 1958)

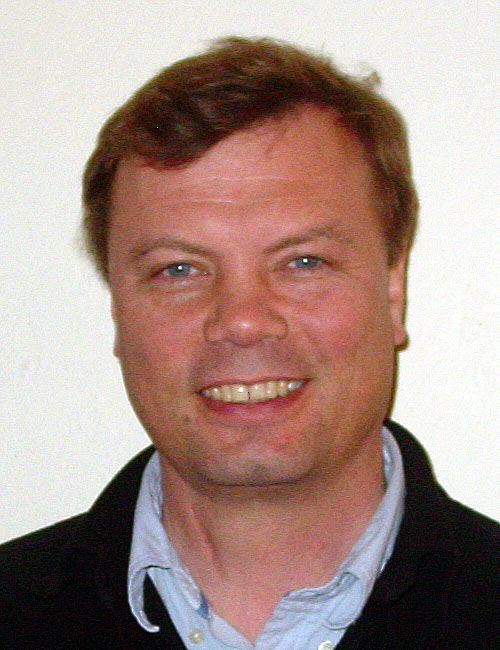
- Born: October 10, 1958 (age 67); Leningrad, Soviet Union
- Education: Leningrad Polytechnical Institute (B.A., 1979); Leningrad State University (B.S., M.A., 1982); Steklov Mathematical Institute (Ph.D., 1984)
- Scientific career
- Fields: Mathematical physics
- Workplaces: Steklov Mathematical Institute; Harvard University; UC Berkeley; University of Amsterdam
- Website: math.berkeley.edu/~reshetik/

Nicolai Yuryevich Reshetikhin (Russian: Николай Юрьевич Решетихин, born October 10, 1958, in Leningrad, Soviet Union) is a mathematical physicist, currently a professor of mathematics at Tsinghua University, China and a professor of mathematical physics at the University of Amsterdam (Korteweg-de Vries Institute for Mathematics). He is also a professor emeritus at the University of California, Berkeley. His research is in the fields of low-dimensional topology, representation theory, and quantum groups. His major contributions are in the theory of quantum integrable systems, in representation theory of quantum groups and in quantum topology. He and Vladimir Turaev constructed invariants of 3-manifolds which are expected to describe quantum Chern–Simons field theory introduced by Edward Witten.

He earned his bachelor's degree and master's degree from Leningrad State University in 1982, and his Ph.D. from the Steklov Mathematical Institute in 1984.

He gave a plenary lecture at the International Congress of Mathematicians in 2010. He was named a Fellow of the American Mathematical Society, in the 2022 class of fellows, "for contributions to the theory of quantum groups, integrable systems, topology, and quantum physics".

In 2022, Reshetikhin received the inaugural Weyl-Wigner Award from ICGTMP.

== See also ==
- Reshetikhin–Turaev invariant
