= 3-category =

In mathematics, especially in category theory, a 3-category is a 2-category together with 3-morphisms. It comes in at least three flavors

- a strict 3-category,
- a semi-strict 3-category also called a Gray category,
- a weak 3-category.

The coherence theorem of Gordon–Power–Street says a weak 3-category is equivalent (in some sense) to a Gray category.

== Strict and weak 3-categories ==
A strict 3-category is defined as a category enriched over 2Cat, the monoidal category of (small) strict 2-categories. A weak 3-category is then defined roughly by replacing the equalities in the axioms by coherent isomorphisms.

== Gray tensor product ==
Introduced by Gray, a Gray tensor product is a replacement of a product of 2-categories that is more convenient for higher category theory. Precisely, given a morphism $f : x \to y$ in a strict 2-category C and $g:a \to b$ in D, the usual product is given as $f \times g : (x, a) \to (y, b)$ that factors both as $u = (\operatorname{id}, g) \circ (f, \operatorname{id})$ and $v = (f, \operatorname{id}) \circ (\operatorname{id}, g)$. The Gray tensor product $f \otimes g$ weakens this so that we merely have a 2-morphism from $u$ to $v$. Some authors require this 2-morphism to be an isomorphism, amounting to replacing lax with pseudo in the theory.

Let Gray be the monoidal category of strict 2-categories and strict 2-functors with the Gray tensor product. Then a Gray category is a category enriched over Gray.

== Variants ==
Tetracategories are the corresponding notion in dimension four. Dimensions beyond three are seen as increasingly significant to the relationship between knot theory and physics.
