= ∞-groupoid =

Abstract homotopical model for topological spaces

In category theory, a branch of mathematics, an ∞-groupoid is an abstract homotopical model for topological spaces. One model uses Kan complexes which are fibrant objects in the category of simplicial sets (with the standard model structure). It is an ∞-category generalization of a groupoid, a category in which every morphism is an isomorphism.

The homotopy hypothesis states that ∞-groupoids are equivalent to spaces up to homotopy.

== Globular Groupoids ==
Alexander Grothendieck suggested in Pursuing Stacks that there should be an extraordinarily simple model of ∞-groupoids using globular sets, originally called hemispherical complexes. These sets are constructed as presheaves on the globular category $\mathbb{G}$. This is defined as the category whose objects are finite ordinals $[n]$ and morphisms are given by
$$\begin{align}
\sigma_n: [n] \to [n+1]\\
\tau_n: [n] \to [n+1]
\end{align}$$
such that the globular relations hold
$$\begin{align}
\sigma_{n+1}\circ\sigma_n &= \tau_{n+1}\circ\sigma_n \\
\sigma_{n+1}\circ\tau_n &= \tau_{n+1}\circ\tau_n
\end{align}$$
These encode the fact that n-morphisms should not be able to see (n + 1)-morphisms. When writing these down as a globular set $X_\bullet: \mathbb{G}^{op} \to \text{Sets}$, the source and target maps are then written as
$$\begin{align}
s_n = X_\bullet(\sigma_n) \\
t_n = X_\bullet(\tau_n)
\end{align}$$
We can also consider globular objects in a category $\mathcal{C}$ as functors
$$X_\bullet\colon \mathbb{G}^{op} \to \mathcal{C} .$$
There was hope originally that such a strict model would be sufficient for homotopy theory, but there is evidence suggesting otherwise. It turns out for $S^2$ its associated homotopy $n$-type $\pi_{\leq n}(S^2)$ can never be modeled as a strict globular groupoid for $n \geq 3$. This is because strict ∞-groupoids only model spaces with a trivial Whitehead product.

== Examples ==
=== Fundamental ∞-groupoid ===
Given a topological space $X$ there should be an associated fundamental ∞-groupoid $\Pi_{\infty} X$ where the objects are points $x \in X$, 1-morphisms $f:x \to y$ are represented as paths, 2-morphisms are homotopies of paths, 3-morphisms are homotopies of homotopies, and so on. From this ∞-groupoid we can find an $n$-groupoid called the fundamental $n$-groupoid $\Pi_n X$ whose homotopy type is that of $\pi_{\leq n} X$.

Note that taking the fundamental ∞-groupoid of a space $Y$ such that $\pi_{>n} Y = 0$ is equivalent to the fundamental n-groupoid $\Pi_n Y$. Such a space can be found using the Whitehead tower.

=== Abelian globular groupoids ===
One useful case of globular groupoids comes from a chain complex which is bounded above, hence let's consider a chain complex $C_\bullet \in \text{Ch}_{\leq0}(\text{Ab})$. There is an associated globular groupoid. Intuitively, the objects are the elements in $C_0$, morphisms come from $C_0$ through the chain complex map $d_1:C_1 \to C_0$, and higher $n$-morphisms can be found from the higher chain complex maps $d_n:C_n \to C_{n-1}$. We can form a globular set $\mathbb{C}_\bullet$ with
$$\begin{matrix}
\mathbb{C}_0 =& C_0 \\
\mathbb{C}_1 =& C_0\oplus C_1 \\
&\cdots \\
\mathbb{C}_n =& \bigoplus_{k=0}^n C_k
\end{matrix}$$
and the source morphism $s_n:\mathbb{C}_n \to \mathbb{C}_{n-1}$ is the projection map
$$pr:\bigoplus_{k=0}^{n}C_k \to \bigoplus_{k=0}^{n-1}C_k$$
and the target morphism $t_n: C_n \to C_{n-1}$ is the addition of the chain complex map $d_n: C_n \to C_{n-1}$ together with the projection map. This forms a globular groupoid giving a wide class of examples of strict globular groupoids. Moreover, because strict groupoids embed inside weak groupoids, they can act as weak groupoids as well.

== Applications ==
=== Higher local systems ===
One of the basic theorems about local systems is that they can be equivalently described as a functor from the fundamental groupoid $\Pi X = \Pi_{\leq 1} X$ to the category of abelian groups, the category of $R$-modules, or some other abelian category. That is, a local system is equivalent to giving a functor
$$\mathcal{L}: \Pi X \to \text{Ab}$$
generalizing such a definition requires us to consider not only an abelian category, but also its derived category. A higher local system is then an ∞-functor
$$\mathcal{L}_\bullet: \Pi_\infty X \to D(\text{Ab})$$
with values in some derived category. This has the advantage of letting the higher homotopy groups $\pi_n X$ to act on the higher local system, from a series of truncations. A toy example to study comes from the Eilenberg–MacLane spaces $K(A, n)$, or by looking at the terms from the Whitehead tower of a space. Ideally, there should be some way to recover the categories of functors $\mathcal{L}_\bullet: \Pi_\infty X \to D(\text{Ab})$ from their truncations $\Pi_n X$ and the maps $\tau_{\leq n-1}: \Pi_n X \to \Pi_{n-1} X$ whose fibers should be the categories of $n$-functors
$$\Pi_n(K(\pi_n X, n)) \to D(\text{Ab})$$
Another advantage of this formalism is it allows for constructing higher forms of $\ell$-adic representations by using the etale homotopy type $\hat{\pi}(X)$ of a scheme $X$ and construct higher representations of this space, since they are given by functors
$$\mathcal{L}:\hat{\pi(X)} \to D(\overline{\mathbb{Q}}_\ell)$$

=== Higher gerbes ===
Another application of ∞-groupoids is giving constructions of n-gerbes and ∞-gerbes. Over a space $X$ an n-gerbe should be an object $\mathcal{G} \to X$ such that when restricted to a small enough subset $U \subset X$, $\mathcal{G}|_U \to U$ is represented by an n-groupoid, and on overlaps there is an agreement up to some weak equivalence. Assuming the homotopy hypothesis is correct, this is equivalent to constructing an object $\mathcal{G} \to X$ such that over any open subset
$$\mathcal{G}|_U \to U$$
is an n-group, or a homotopy n-type. Because the nerve of a category can be used to construct an arbitrary homotopy type, a functor over a site $\mathcal{X}$, e.g.
$$p:\mathcal{C}\to \mathcal{X}$$
will give an example of a higher gerbe if the category $\mathcal{C}_U$ lying over any point $U \in \operatorname{Ob}\mathcal{X}$ is a non-empty category. In addition, it would be expected this category would satisfy some sort of descent condition.

== See also ==
- Pursuing Stacks
- n-group
- Homotopy type theory
- Core of a category
- (∞, n)-category
- Joyal's extension and lifting theorems
