= Ross Street =

Australian mathematician

Ross Howard Street (born 29 September 1945, Sydney) is an Australian mathematician specialising in category theory.

== Biography ==
Street completed his undergraduate and postgraduate study at the University of Sydney, where his dissertation advisor was Max Kelly. He is an emeritus professor of mathematics at Macquarie University, a fellow of the Australian Mathematical Society (1995), and was elected Fellow of the Australian Academy of Science in 1989. He was awarded the Edgeworth David Medal of the Royal Society of New South Wales in 1977, and the Australian Mathematical Society's George Szekeres Medal in 2012.
