= Management development =

Learning process

Management development is the process by which managers learn and improve their management skills. In organisational development, management effectiveness is recognized as a determinant of organisational success. Therefore, investment in management development can have a direct economic benefit to the organisation.

== History ==
In the 1940s, Professor Reginald Revans coined the term action learning to describe an educational model whereby the managers study their own actions and experiences in order to improve performance. Action-learning based management development model can be seen today in many leadership and organization development initiatives.. Many management qualifications now have an action learning element. Action learning asserts that individuals learn best from hands-on experience.

One of the biggest growth areas in UK education since the early 1980s has been the growth of university-level management education. In addition to weekly part-time attendance at college/university, many students employ distance learning. The number of UK business schools grew from two in the early 1970s, to over one hundred providers.

In 2004, according to the United Kingdom's Chartered Management Institute, the money spent per year per manager on management and leadership development was £1,035, an average of 6.3 days per manager.

== Approaches ==
- Dysfunction analysis
- Mentoring
- Coaching
- Job rotation
- Professional development
- Business workflow analysis
- Upward feedback
- Executive education
- Supervisory training

== Purpose ==
Managers are an integral part of the decision-making processes of organizations. Therefore, management development is a crucial factor in improving their performance. A management development program may help reduce employee turnover, improve employee satisfaction, better able a company to track manager performance, improve managers' people management skills, improve management productivity and morale, and prepare managers for technological change.

== Coaching ==
Coaching is a teaching, training or development process in which an individual is supported while achieving a specific personal or professional result or goal. Coaching is an effective learning tool that affects the bottom line and productivity, as well as intangible benefits. It aids in the improvement of individual performance, tackles underperformance, and aids in the identification of personal learning needs.

== Psychological traits ==
A study of oil-industry middle-management in Iran in 2019, suggested advantages in selecting middle managers on the basis of self-reliance, self-efficiency, building trust, and legal attitude.

== Programmes ==
Large corporates and management institutes conduct management-development programmes in order to enable current and prospective managers to develop an understanding of management concepts, practices, approaches, and perspectives. (MDP)

The participants receive an immersive learning experience, are encouraged to provide insights on situational problems, and are exposed to the views of other participants in their group. Through this process, they gain problem-solving skills and analytical-thinking abilities.

== See also ==
- Chartered Institute of Personnel and Development
- Chartered Management Institute
- Institute of Leadership & Management
- Leadership development
- Training & Development
