= Leader development =

Leader development is defined as the "expansion of a person's capacity to be effective in leadership roles and processes" (McCauley, Van Veslor, & Rudeman, 2010, p. 2). These roles and processes are ones that aid in setting direction, creating alignment and maintaining commitment in groups of people sharing common work. Most organizational leadership research and educational programs have focused on developing individual-based knowledge, skills, and abilities associated with formal leadership roles (human capital) of individuals (Day, 2000). Leader development therefore results by investing in human capital.

== Developmental theory ==
While there is no specific theory from which leader development derives, developmental theory taps into two aspects of development: learning and change. Development is a form of change and it is impossible for a leader to develop without change occurring (Day & Zacarro, 2004). Learning is defined as the attainment of a permanent change in a person because of practice or experience, which then drives change and development (Day & Zacarro, 2004). Learning stems from two traditions: a permanent change in behavior following experience based on behaviorism, and a change in or creation of new mental models based on Gestalt psychology. Behaviorism allows for performance to be used as an indicator of a leader's behavior. In contrast, Gestalt psychology examines the creation of new mental models that arise from experience, which can help a leader develop their intrapersonal competence. Together, behaviorism and Gestalt traditions are thought to be complementary in the fact that development comes from both changing mental models and creating new behaviors (Hogan and Warrenfeltz, 2003).

== Differentiating between leader development and leadership development ==
Leader development is described as one aspect of the broader process of leadership development (McCauley et al., 2010). Leadership development is defined as the expansion of a group's capacity to produce direction, alignment, and commitment (McCauley et al.), in contrast to leader development which is the expansion of a one's ability to be effective in leadership roles and processes. Further distinctions between the two can be made by looking at components of each model. Leader development focuses on developing individual knowledge, skills, and abilities (human capital), whereas leadership development focuses on building networked relationships (social capital) among individuals in an organization. Leader development keys in on the assumption that effective leadership occurs through the development of individual leaders, whereas leadership development is a function of the social resources that are rooted in relationships (Day, 2000). In leader development, the focus is on intrapersonal skills of self-awareness, self-regulation, and self-motivation; leadership development focuses on interpersonal skills of social awareness and social skills (Day, 2000). Day (2000) argues that what most organizations term as leadership development should be more accurately labeled as leader development. Organizations cannot choose one or the other approach, but instead a bridge must be anchored on either side of leader and leadership development for effective development to occur (Kegan, 1994). Therefore, it is important to develop the intrapersonal capabilities to serve as a foundation for interpersonal competence and link both leader and leadership development together.

== Differentiating between leader development and management development ==
Management development and leadership development can often be confused as one. Although they also can overlap, there are key differences between the two that are not to get confused with leader development. Leadership processes allow groups of people to work together, whereas management processes are considered to be position and organization specific (Keys & Wolf, 1988). Management development includes managerial education and training (Latham & Seijts, 1998; Mailick, Stumpf, Grant, Kfir, & Watson, 1998). There is a greater emphasis on gaining specific types of knowledge, skills, and abilities to enhance task performance in management roles (Baldwin & Padgett,1994; Keys & Wolfe, 1988; Wexley & Baldwin, 1986). Also, management development's goal is to apply proven solutions to problems giving it more of a training orientation. Management development focuses more on the formal managerial roles.

== Leader development model ==
McCauley, Van Veslor, and Ruderman (2010) explain a two-part model for developing leaders. The first part illustrates three elements that combine to make developmental experiences stronger: assessment, challenge and support. Assessment lets leaders know where they stand in areas of strengths, current performance level, and developmental needs. Challenging experiences are ones that stretch a leader's ability to work outside of their comfort zone, develop new skills and abilities, and provide important opportunities to learn. Support, which comes in the form of bosses, co-workers, friends, family, coaches and mentors, enables leaders to handle the struggle of developing. The second part of the leader development model (McCauley et al., 2010) illustrates that the leader development process involves a variety of developmental experiences and the ability to learn from them. These experiences and the ability to learn also affect each other in that a leader with a high ability to learn will search for developmental experiences and through developmental experiences leaders will increase their ability to learn. It is also important to note that the leader development process is rooted in a particular leadership context which includes elements such as age, culture, economic conditions, gender of the population, organizational purpose and mission, and business strategy (McCauley et al.). This environment molds the leader development process. Along with assessment, challenge and support, leadership context are important aspects of the leader development model.

== YGLP ==
YGLP is an international leadership program for university and high school students aiming to groom young minds into exemplary leaders.

YGLP was developed by Human Science Lab, London, with support from several transnational organizations and foundations. The objective behind creation of YGLP was to come up with a path-breaking leadership model that could be used across the globe to create a new generation of leaders who can push the limit of human accomplishments to new frontier.

The Four-Step Leadership theory formulated under the HSL Leadership Project at Human Science Lab, London, provides the scientific framework for YGLP. The theory stipulates that "the leadership achievement of an individual is proportional to the optimal use of four principal components that makes a leader –motivation, planning, energising and executing".

YGLP contains four core modules and one non-core module. Each core module is designed to optimise one of the four leadership component enumerated in the Four-Step Leadership Principle i.e. motivating, planning, energising and executing.

== Intrapersonal competencies ==
There are three types of intrapersonal competencies related to leader development: self-awareness (emotional awareness, self-confidence, and accurate self-image), self-regulation (self-control, trustworthiness, adaptability and personal responsibility), and self-motivation (commitment, initiative, and optimism) (Day, 2000).

=== Self-awareness ===
In today's changing environment, the two personal capabilities that allow a leader to learn new skills or competencies are self-awareness (identity) and adaptability (Briscoe & Hall, 1999; Hall, 1986a, 1986b, 2002). Leader development is personal development and involves the process of becoming more aware of one's self (Hall, 2004). Self-awareness is the extent to which people are conscious of various aspects of their identities and the extent to which their self-perceptions are congruent with the way others perceive them (Hall, 2004). Self-awareness has been referred to as "the first component of emotional intelligence" and discusses how it is "the ability to recognize and understand your moods, emotions, and drives, as well as their effects on others" (Goleman, 1998, p. 95). This is vital for a leader to be able to evaluate themselves to recognize their impact on their thinking and decisions as well as on other individuals.

=== Self-regulation ===
Self-regulation has been conceptualized in proposed models by Tsui and Ashford (1994) as well as Wood and Bandura (1989). The models have some differences but agree on a fundamental sequence where individuals (a) regulate their attention and effort around self-set goals or assigned goals, (b) take action to achieve their goals, (c) obtain their goals or their performance strategy, if necessary, to maintain or enhance their progress toward their goals and (e) recommence the cycle. Tsui and Ashford (1994) describe the procedure as setting the goal, behaving, detecting a discrepancy, and lastly reducing any discrepancy. This process is vital in leader development because it can have both internal and external effects. As Sosik, Potosky, and Jung (2002) stated that, "individuals desire congruence between their own and others’ perceptions of their behavior, and, therefore, set and work toward goals to reduce perceptual discrepancies, gain congruence, and improve their effectiveness" (p. 212). This is similar to the intrapersonal competence of self-awareness as individuals want their own perception of themselves be congruent with those of others, both outlining importance for leader development.

=== Self-motivation ===
Self-motivation involves having higher levels of identification to be motivated to go beyond contracts and exchanges in both their own development and performance (Hall, 2004). Together, the capabilities of self-awareness, self-regulation and self-motivation allow for enhanced individual knowledge, trust, and personal power, which can be seen as fundamental to create in a leader (Zand, 1997).

== Modes of development ==
Leader development takes place through multiple mechanisms: formal instruction, developmental job assignments, 360-degree feedback, executive coaching, and self-directed learning (Boyce, Zaccaro & Wisecarver, 2009; Day, 2000). These mechanisms may occur independently, but are more effective in combination.

=== Formal training ===
Organizations often offer formal training programs to their leaders. Traditional styles provide leaders with required knowledge and skills in a particular area by utilizing coursework, practice, "overlearning" with rehearsals, and feedback (Kozlowski, 1998). This traditional lecture-based classroom training is useful; however, the limitations include the leader's ability to transfer the information from a training environment to a work setting.

=== Developmental job assignments ===
Following formal training organizations should assign leaders to developmental jobs that target the newly acquired skills (Zacarro & Banks, 2004). A job that is developmental is one in which leaders learn, undergo personal change, and gain leadership skills resulting from the roles, responsibilities and tasks involved in that job (McCauley & Brutus, 1998). Developmental job assignments are one of the most effective forms of leader development (Ohlott, 2004). After training a leader should first complete a "stamping-in" assignment". A "stamping-in" assignment is one in which the leader masters the new skills before moving on to a "stretch assignment" (Zacarro & Banks). The "stretch" or developmental assignment challenges the leader's new skills and pushes them out of their comfort zone to operate in a more complex environment involving new elements, problems and dilemmas to resolve (Ohlott, 2004). A truly development assignment doesn't depend on existing skills, it challenges the leader to understand his or her current limitations and develop new skills (Zaccaro & Banks). These assignments should be given to leaders who do not possess the skills to succeed at the current assignment, but who have the ability to succeed at higher levels (Zaccarro & Banks). Developmental assignments should be accompanied by appropriate feedback that assesses the leader's strengths and weaknesses in order to be successful (Zaccaro & Banks).

=== Three hundred and sixty-degree feedback ===
Three hundred and sixty-degree feedback is a necessary component of leader development which allows leaders to maximize learning opportunities from their current assignment. It systematically provides the leader with perceptions of his or her performance from a full circle of viewpoints including subordinates, peers, superiors (Day, 2000), and the leader's own self-assessment (Zaccaro & Banks, 2004). With many different sources from which to interpret information, the messages may differ and be difficult to interpret. However, when several different sources concur on a similar perspective, whether a strength or weakness, the clarity of the message increases (King & Santana, 2010). For this mechanism to be effective, the leader must accept feedback and be open and willing to make changes. An effective way to facilitate the feedback through full transparency, open discussion and to help facilitate change is through coaching (Day, 2000).

=== Executive coaching ===
The goal of executive coaching focuses on enhancing the leader's effectiveness along with the effectiveness of the team and organization (Frankovelgia & Riddle, 2010). It involves an intense one-on-one relationship designed at learning important lessons through assessment, challenge, and support. Although coaching is sometimes aimed at correcting a fault, it is being used more and more to help already successful leaders move to the next level of increased responsibilities, and new and complex challenges. Coaching must move toward measurable goals that contribute to individual and organizational growth. Day (2000) proposes that leaders should be carefully selected, willing to change, and matched with a compatible coach in order for coaching to be most effective.

=== Self-directed learning ===
Self-directed learning is an individual leader's aim in identifying the focus of development, specifying the developmental processes, and identifying the resources (Boyce, Zaccaro, & Wisecarver, 2010). Self-development is the process of not only acquiring new skills but also gaining an understanding of the leader's environment and self through new experiences and activities, such as seeking out mentors or developmental job assignments (Boyce, Zaccaro, & Wisecarver, 2010).

== Application ==
The Army has been conducting leader development studies since as early as 1971; studies include a review of education and training for Army officers, and professional development of officers, warrant officers, and non-commissioned officers. In 1987, the Army Chief of Staff directed a comprehensive leader development study to be conducted which produced the Army's leader development system, a support system to monitor and adapt to the effects of change on Army leader development, and a leader development action plan (U.S. Army, 1994). The U.S. Army Research Institute's (ARI) research topics include training, leader development, and soldier research and development. One area ARI's leadership development program focuses on is ways to provide accelerated development of Army leaders.

== See also ==
- Leader Development and Assessment Course
- Leadership development
- Management development
- YGLP
