= RAPAR =

UK charitable organization

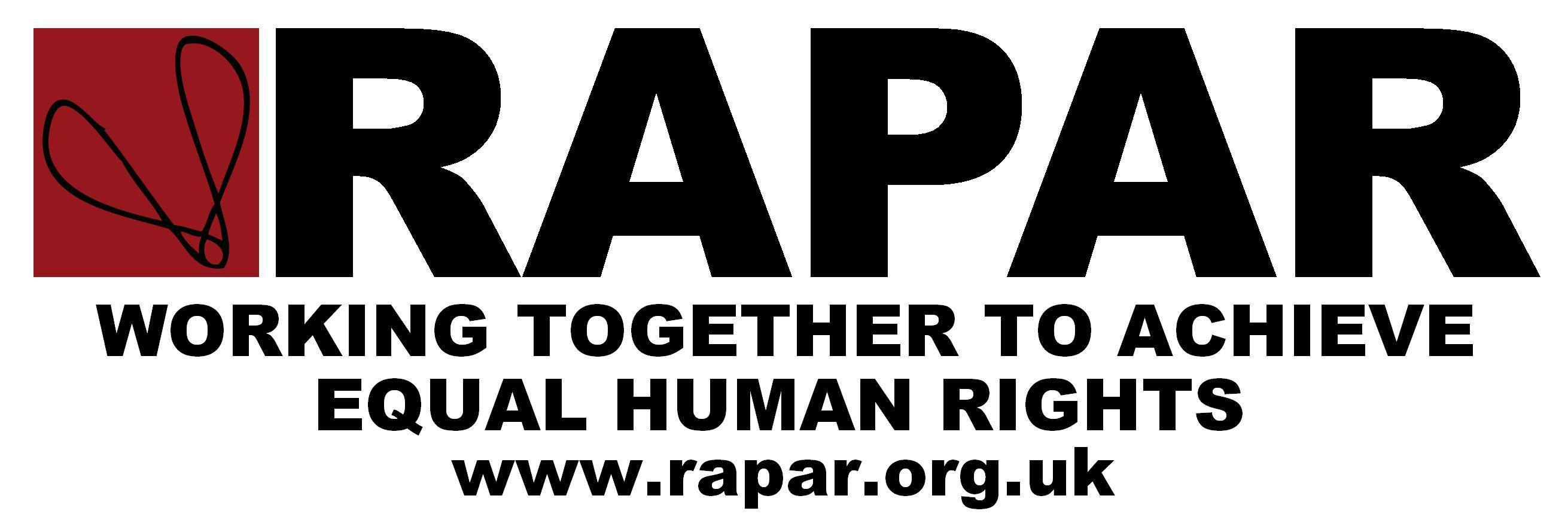
- Formation: 2001
- Founded at: Salford
- Type: Human rights organisation
- Purpose: Displaced people
- Headquarters: Manchester, UK
- Website: www.rapar.org.uk

RAPAR (Refugee and Asylum Participatory Action Research) is a human rights organisation based in Manchester, UK, which is primarily concerned with displaced people, and issues relating to displaced people.

RAPAR was founded in Salford in 2001. Initial membership comprised academics, researchers, displaced people, second and third generation migrants, and practitioners in the fields of community development and statutory services.

A registered charity, RAPAR functions as a support provider to displaced people, a campaign group, a community development facilitator and a research producer. It was the winner of the 2009 Elspeth Kyle National Award for Best Community Impact.

== Main activities ==
=== Casework ===
RAPAR supports displaced people in a variety of ways, including providing asylum seekers whose application has been rejected by UK Visas and Immigration with the means to develop campaigns against this decision. This may include helping to set up petitions, encouraging advocacy letters to politicians, cultivating press and media interest, providing access to legal assistance and helping to organise protests and demonstrations. More general services include facilitating links to local communities and groups and providing support relating to issues such as education and housing.

=== Community Development ===
RAPAR encourages the formation of local groups and networks and supports a number of initiatives, including:

- Walking With The Cloak, a women's group based in the Cheetham Hill area of Manchester
- Somali Community Forums for men and women
- The Beja Congress for expatriate members of the Beja people of Eastern Sudan
- The Elikya Project, a magazine relating to French–speaking Africa and its diasporas
- The Persian Society, a network for expatriate Iranians
- YoungRAPAR, a youth group.

=== Research ===
RAPAR develops research projects and learning opportunities relating to displaced people. RAPAR cites the Action Research principle first expounded by Kurt Lewin in 1946, and the Action Learning of Reginald Revans (1998) as important to its methodology and ethos. This approach centres around social research with a practical goal, and a research methodology that favours research being conducted by the research subjects. It has produced research for the Joseph Rowntree Foundation and the Equality and Human Rights Commission.

== Funding ==
RAPAR is run entirely on a voluntary basis, with financial support from changing sources. Past funding has come from The Allen Lane Foundation, The Lloyds TSB Foundation, Gingerbread, individual donors, and fundraising events.
