= Thomas N. Garavan =

Irish human resource development scholar

- Known for: Strategic human resource development
- Awards: AHRD Outstanding HRD Scholar Award (2013); AHRD HRD Scholar Hall of Fame (2019); UCC Researcher of the Year (2023)

Academic background
- Alma mater: University of Limerick (BBS); University of Bristol (EdD)

Academic work
- Discipline: Human resource development
- Sub-discipline: Strategic human resource development; leadership development; learning and development
- Institutions: University of Limerick; Edinburgh Napier University; University College Cork; National College of Ireland

Thomas N. Garavan is an Irish academic who researches human resource development (HRD), workplace learning and leadership. He received the Academy of Human Resource Development's Outstanding HRD Scholar Award in 2013 and was later inducted into its HRD Scholar Hall of Fame. His 1991 work on the characteristics of strategic HRD was later built on in research on the strategic maturity of HRD functions. He is Professor of Leadership Practice at Cork University Business School, University College Cork, and editor-in-chief of Human Resource Development Review. He has also campaigned on behalf of survivors of Ireland's mother and baby homes.

== Early life and education ==
Garavan grew up in Newport, County Mayo, and attended the Christian Brothers secondary school in Westport. In the early 1980s he studied work psychology and human resource management at the University of Limerick, graduating with a Bachelor of Business Studies. He later completed a Doctor of Education at the University of Bristol.

== Career ==
Garavan spent the early part of his career at the University of Limerick, where he was a lecturer in human resource development by 1995 and worked in the Department of Personnel and Employment Relations. He later became a professor at the university's Kemmy Business School.

He later joined Edinburgh Napier University in Scotland, where he served as a Research Professor and received the Academy of Human Resource Development's Outstanding HRD Scholar Award in 2013. He then became Professor of Leadership Practice at Cork University Business School, University College Cork, and also holds the title of Research and visiting professor at the National College of Ireland in Dublin.

== Research ==
His 1991 article "Strategic Human Resource Development" in the Journal of European Industrial Training reviewed the literature on the characteristics of strategic HRD and presented evidence on HRD policy formulation and planning in Irish high-technology companies.

In 1994, he and Barra O'Cinneide published a two-part review of entrepreneurship education and training programmes, finding that they emphasised knowledge over competence and were seldom evaluated for effectiveness.

In 1995, he and co-authors Pat Costine and Noreen Heraty examined the emergence and application of strategic HRD in industry, including a stakeholder-based approach. In the late 1990s and early 2000s, he also published reviews on learning organisations, 360-degree feedback and the role of HRD in human capital development.

In a 2007 article in Advances in Developing Human Resources he proposed a multi-level model of strategic HRD, centred on how organisational context and HRD processes interact. With David McGuire, he co-authored the introduction to a 2010 issue of the same journal, which argued that HRD can help organisations embed corporate social responsibility, sustainability and ethics.

His research has examined HRD in small and medium-sized enterprises, the relationship between training and organisational performance, and national HRD, for which he and his co-authors proposed a research agenda based on ecological systems theory. With Maura Sheehan and Michael Morley, he also studied the relationship between training and innovation in knowledge-intensive firms across four European countries.

== Editorial and professional service ==
Garavan has been editor-in-chief of Human Resource Development Review, a journal sponsored by the Academy of Human Resource Development, since 1 July 2023. He was earlier editor-in-chief of the Journal of European Industrial Training and, with Ronan Carbery, has edited its successor, the European Journal of Training and Development. He has served as an associate editor of Personnel Review and of Human Resource Development International. He has served two terms on the board of directors of the Academy of Human Resource Development and has also been a board member of the University Forum for Human Resource Development.

In 2022, he was engaged as an external expert by the Irish government's Independent Review Group – Defence Forces, preparing two reviews on workplace misconduct and organisational culture that were included in the group's 2023 final report to the Minister for Defence.

== Awards and recognition ==
In 2013, Garavan received the Outstanding HRD Scholar Award from the Academy of Human Resource Development. Between 2014 and 2020 he also received the academy's research excellence awards on several occasions: the Richard A. Swanson award (2014 and 2019), the Monica M. Lee award (2018 and 2020) and the Elwood F. Holton III award (2019). In 2019 he was named to its HRD Scholar Hall of Fame, and he was formally inducted in February 2021.

In 2023, Garavan received first place in the Alan Moon Memorial Prize at the University Forum for Human Resource Development conference for a co-authored paper on management development in small and medium-sized firms in Ireland. He was also named Researcher of the Year at the University College Cork Research and Innovation Awards, presented in May 2024.

Garavan has been included in the Stanford University–Elsevier list of the top 2% most-cited scientists in several years, including 2020, 2023, 2025 and 2026. Research.com has ranked him the top researcher in business and management in Ireland in every edition of its ranking from 2022 to 2026.

== Advocacy ==
In the 1930s, Garavan's mother and her siblings were taken from their parents in County Mayo and placed in the Bon Secours home in Tuam, County Galway. Garavan later traced her siblings and reconnected members of the family who had been separated. By 2024 he had campaigned for around a decade for the exhumation of the mass grave at the site of the Tuam home.

== Selected publications ==
=== Books ===
- McGuire, David; Garavan, Thomas N.; Dooley, Larry M., eds. (2012). Fundamentals of Human Resource Development. SAGE Library in Business and Management. Vol. 1–4. SAGE Publications. doi:10.4135/9781446261750. ISBN 978-1-4462-0156-5.
- Garavan, Thomas; McCarthy, Alma; Morley, Michael, eds. (2016). Global Human Resource Development: Regional and Country Perspectives. Routledge.
- Garavan, Thomas; McCarthy, Alma; Carbery, Ronan, eds. (2017). Handbook of International Human Resource Development: Context, Processes and People. Cheltenham: Edward Elgar. ISBN 978-1-78195-417-1.
- Bailey, Catherine; Mankin, David; Kelliher, Clare; Garavan, Thomas (2018). Strategic Human Resource Management (2nd ed.). Oxford: Oxford University Press. ISBN 978-0-19-870540-6.
- Garavan, Thomas N.; O'Brien, Fergal; Duggan, James; Gubbins, Claire; Lai, Yanqing; Carbery, Ronan; Heneghan, Sinead; Lannon, Ronnie; Sheehan, Maura; Grant, Kirsteen (2020). Learning and Development Effectiveness in Organisations: An Integrated Systems-Informed Model of Effectiveness. Cham: Palgrave Macmillan. doi:10.1007/978-3-030-48900-7. ISBN 978-3-030-48899-4.

=== Journal articles ===
- Garavan, Thomas N. (1991). "Strategic Human Resource Development". Journal of European Industrial Training. 15 (1) EUM0000000000219: 17–30. doi:10.1108/EUM0000000000219.
- Garavan, Thomas N.; O'Cinneide, Barra (1994). "Entrepreneurship Education and Training Programmes: A Review and Evaluation – Part 1". Journal of European Industrial Training. 18 (8): 3–12. doi:10.1108/03090599410068024.
- Garavan, Thomas N.; Costine, Pat; Heraty, Noreen (1995). "The emergence of strategic human resource development". Journal of European Industrial Training. 19 (10): 4–10. doi:10.1108/03090599510095816.
- Garavan, Thomas (1997). "The learning organization: a review and evaluation". The Learning Organization. 4 (1): 18–29. doi:10.1108/09696479710156442.
- Garavan, Thomas N.; Morley, Michael; Flynn, Mary (1997). "360 degree feedback: its role in employee development". Journal of Management Development. 16 (2): 134–147. doi:10.1108/02621719710164300.
- Garavan, Thomas N.; Morley, Michael; Gunnigle, Patrick; Collins, Eammon (2001). "Human capital accumulation: the role of human resource development". Journal of European Industrial Training. 25 (2/3/4): 48–68. doi:10.1108/EUM0000000005437.
- Garavan, Thomas N. (2007). "A Strategic Perspective on Human Resource Development". Advances in Developing Human Resources. 9 (1): 11–30. doi:10.1177/1523422306294492.
- Garavan, Thomas N.; McGuire, David (2010). "Human Resource Development and Society: Human Resource Development's Role in Embedding Corporate Social Responsibility, Sustainability, and Ethics in Organizations". Advances in Developing Human Resources. 12 (5): 487–507. doi:10.1177/1523422310394757.
- Garavan, Thomas; McCarthy, Alma; Carbery, Ronan (2019). "An Ecosystems Perspective on International Human Resource Development: A Meta-Synthesis of the Literature". Human Resource Development Review. 18 (2): 248–288. doi:10.1177/1534484319828865.
- Nolan, Ciara T.; Garavan, Thomas N. (2016). "Human Resource Development in SMEs: A Systematic Review of the Literature". International Journal of Management Reviews. 18 (1): 85–107. doi:10.1111/ijmr.12062.
- Garavan, Thomas; McCarthy, Alma; Lai, Yanqing; Murphy, Kevin; Sheehan, Maura; Carbery, Ronan (2021). "Training and organisational performance: A meta-analysis of temporal, institutional and organisational context moderators". Human Resource Management Journal. 31 (1): 93–119. doi:10.1111/1748-8583.12284. hdl:10379/15971.
- Garavan, Thomas; Wang, Jia; Nolan, Ciara; Lai, Yanqing; O'Brien, Fergal; Darcy, Colette; Matthews-Smith, Gerri; McLean, Gary (2023). "Putting the individual and context back into national human resource development research: A systematic review and research agenda". International Journal of Management Reviews. 25 (1): 152–175. doi:10.1111/ijmr.12308.
- Sheehan, Maura; Garavan, Thomas; Morley, Michael (2025). "Training investments and innovation gains in knowledge intensive businesses: The role of firm level human capital and knowledge sharing climate". Human Resource Management Journal. 35 (3): 667–686. doi:10.1111/1748-8583.12586.
