= Executive education =

Academic programs at graduate-level business schools

Executive education (ExEd or Exec. Ed) refers to academic programs at graduate-level business schools for executives, business leaders and managers, globally. These programs are generally non-credit and non-degree-granting, but sometimes lead to certificates, and some offer continuing education units accepted by professional bodies and institutes. Estimates by Business Week magazine suggest that executive education in the United States is an $800 million annual business, with approximately 80% provided by university-based business schools. Many traditionally upper-tier schools, as well as business schools and other academic institutions, offer these programs.

Customized programs tailored for executives of a single company represented the fastest-growing segment of the market in the 1990s. These programs help organizations increase management capability as they enable executives to develop new knowledge, skills, and attitudes. Open enrollment programs are also available as a part of university-based executive education offerings. These programs are held throughout the year on selected dates and are open to participants from different companies and organizations.

Shorter executive education programs tend to focus on specific roles or industries, or on improving specific leadership skills, such as persuasion, negotiation, team building, or communication. Others offer comprehensive management training options, such as the modular Advanced Management Program (AMP), offered independently by several business schools.

Not all observations of university-based executive education are positive. There is some debate about whether professional development is an appropriate part of a business school's curriculum. Some believe that university-based executive education has caused some business schools to “lose track of their professional mission.” This argument is made by Rakesh Khurana, among others.

== History ==
The beginning of executive education can be traced to Frederick Taylor and his 1911 treatise Principles of Scientific Management. This book described how the application of the scientific method to the management of workers could improve productivity. Taylor's ideas, also known as “Taylorism,” later became the standard for businesses worldwide.

Following Taylorism, in 1914 the Alfred P. Sloan School of Management began offering Course XV, Engineering Administration, at the Massachusetts Institute of Technology. At the time, the concept of providing business training in the academic environment was gaining popularity; in response, MIT created a program “specially designed to train men to be competent managers of businesses that have much to do with engineering problems.” Harvard also began offering short five-week selections of standard MBA material in the late 1920s.

In 1930, Course XV at MIT became an independent department and was named the Department of Business and Engineering Administration. In 1931, a 1-year graduate program for executive development—focused on the fundamentals of management and decision-making—was initiated with the backing of several industrialists. The program was aimed at young managers who were nominated by their employers, and was highly competitive. In 1938, the program received full funding from the Alfred P. Sloan Foundation and was formally named the MIT Sloan Fellowship Program for Executive Development at MIT.

Executive education in the United States developed significantly after World War II. The Servicemen's Readjustment Act of 1944—commonly known as the GI Bill of Rights—allowed veterans to take advantage of education benefits. Many studied business in college, which was previously an opportunity only available to the wealthy. Subsequent executive education programs, including the 13-week Advanced Management Program at Harvard University and the four-week Institute for Management at Northwestern University's School of Commerce (now the Kellogg School of Management), developed in response to the need to rapidly train line executives for general management in the post-World War II era.

By the late 1970s, nearly 20 business schools in the United States were offering some form of executive education. The science of business was also developing at a rapid pace, as academics such as Michael Porter (Harvard) and C. K. Prahalad (University of Michigan) published academic papers that changed the way people thought and acted within companies.

Prahalad is most notably remembered for developing the concepts of “core competencies” and “strategic intent”. He, along with other business academics such as Don Hambrick, Ram Charan, David Ulrich, Michael Hammer, and Gary Hamel, shaped executive education as it is known today, contributed to the ongoing effort to facilitate wealth creation, and developed other concepts aimed at making stronger businesses while improving the welfare of the world.

Throughout the 1970s, university-based executive education continued to evolve as an industry. On-campus residential facilities were constructed at several universities, in a move towards standalone facilities dedicated to executive education programs. This spurred the development of such facilities at schools nationwide and the subsequent expansion of short open enrollment programs. The industry's exclusive professional association, The International University Consortium for Executive Education (UNICON), also came into existence during this period. UNICON began sponsoring a trade show in the 1970s for companies interested in learning about university-based executive education, and an annual conference for members. UNICON has since grown into a consortium of nearly 100 universities with executive education programs around the globe. It sponsors three annual conferences that allow members to share best practices, conducts research into topics of concern, and provides benchmarking data for members.

In the 1970s through 1990s, many executive education institutes and universities started adopting the professional action learning model originally developed by Professor Reginald Revans in the 1940s. The Executive Action-Learning (EAL) model differs from the traditional academic teaching methods based on lectures and quizzes, instead focusing on collaborative learning via experiential reflection, using case studies and problem-solving exercises as the major learning tools.

Executive education further developed in the 1980s and 1990s as the increasing pace and scope of global business demanded higher levels of education among employees. The dot-com boom further changed the scope of the business landscape, favouring employees and organizations that were quick to adapt to change. As long-standing business concepts became obsolete, continual training was necessary, while earning a degree was not.

In a 1999 survey of 63 programs, the University of Michigan Business School was placed at the top of the list. By the next survey in 2001, the number of programs had doubled to 121, with a doubling of revenues to $800M. Shortly after the survey, the growth of executive education programs was dramatically impacted by travel restrictions and the economic impact of the September 11 attacks.

== Current situation ==
Despite the growing popularity of university-based executive education around the world, the global economic recession has slowed the industry's growth during the last years of the 2010s. According to a 2011 study conducted by the Manchester Business School in partnership with Dubai International Academic City and Dubai Knowledge Village, the global economic downturn has had a negative impact on learning and development spending within the Middle East. More than half the respondents noted that spending on executive education had been “significantly” affected, while other organizations agreed that spending had been “somewhat” affected.

A return to higher participation appears to be coming as the economy shows more signs of improvement. A substantial portion of the organizations surveyed by Manchester Business School said they anticipate executive education spending to moderately increase during the next three years.

The situation is similar in other parts of the world according to a late 2010 state of the industry survey conducted by UNICON, which found that many prestigious universities with executive education programs around the world expect notably higher enrollment during 2011. Sixty-five percent of UNICON survey participants predicted increased participation in their open enrollment programs in 2011. Additionally, 78 percent of schools projected an increase in customized executive education programs during 2011. Nearly half of the schools surveyed indicated an increase in their number of programming days, now offering up to 39 weeks in open enrollment programs and an average of 49 weeks in custom programs. Slightly more than half also reported increasing the number of days that educational programs for executives are offered.

== Rankings ==
Executive education rankings are carried out annually by the Financial Times and by Bloomberg BusinessWeek. Rankings may be based on various metrics, such as diversity, faculty, revenue, and participants.

The Financial Times publishes annual rankings of executive education programs, including separate rankings for open-enrolment and customized programs. Schools such as London Business School, HEC Paris, IMD and IESE Business School have regularly appeared among the highest-ranked institutions.

== See also ==
- Business education
- Business school
- List of business schools per country
- Corporate Education
- Debt
- Executive MBA
- Leadership development
- Business acumen
- Organizational development
- Usury
