= Religious Freedom & Business Foundation =

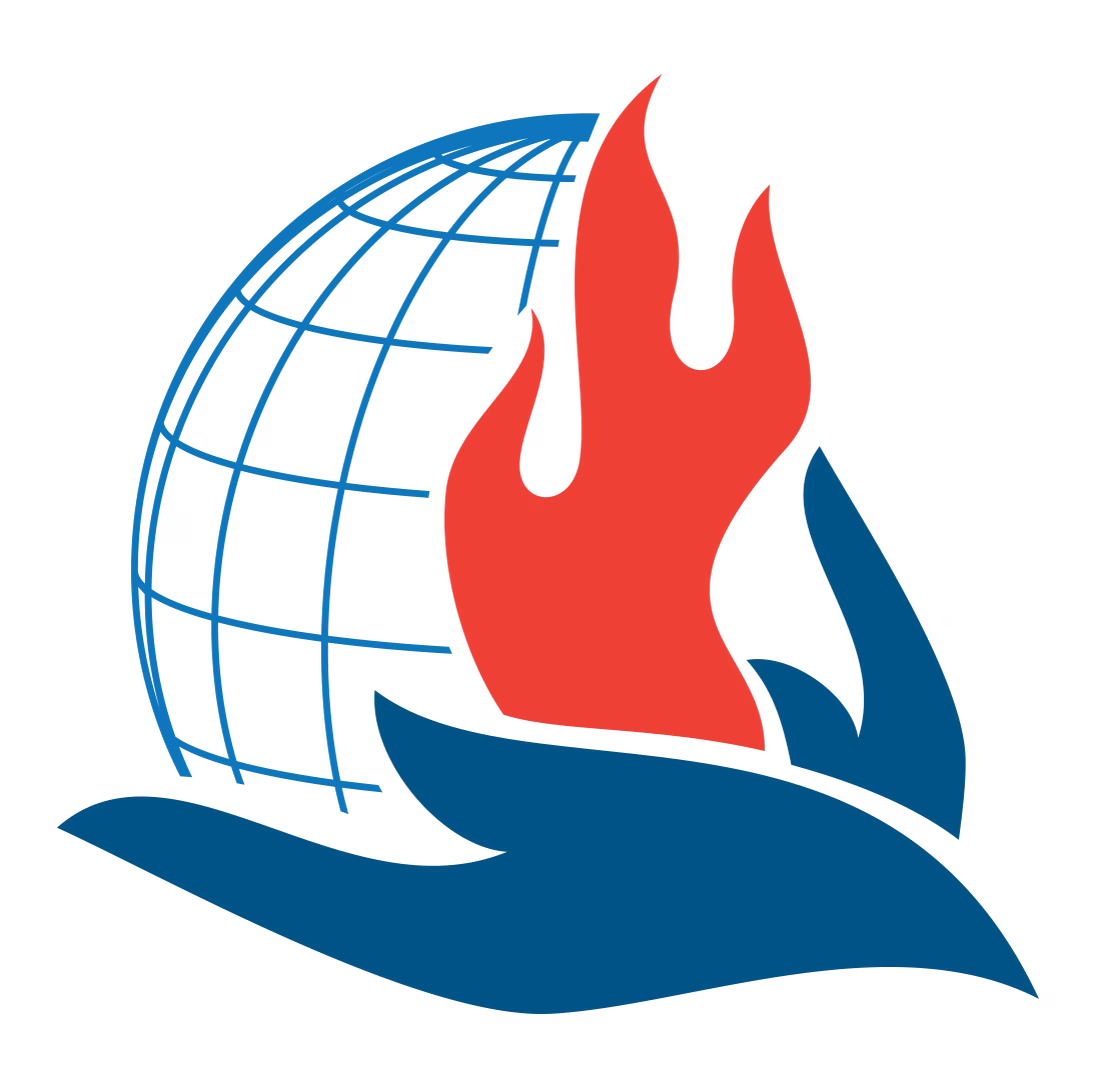
Religious Freedom & Business Foundation (RFBF) logo.

Religious Freedom & Business Foundation (RFBF) is an international relations foundation, founded by Brian J. Grim, that works with global business, policymakers, non-government organizations (NGOs), and consumers that develop freedom of religion or belief (FoRB) pluralist corporate education on issues related to religion and economic development.

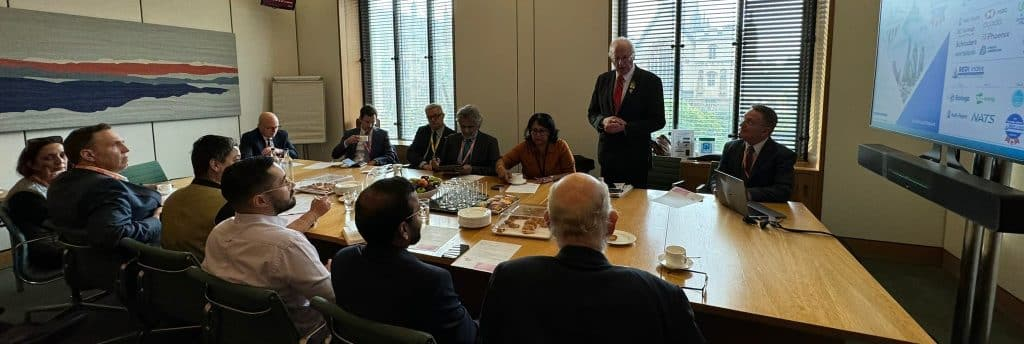
A RFBF employee resource group (ERG).

Its human resources management job analysis and labor relations studies are responsible for its justice equity diversity inclusion (JEDI) cultural diplomacy framework, the Religious Equity Diversity Inclusion (REDI) Index international ranking, Dare to Overcome (DTO), and the creation of several multifaith spaces along interfaith employee resource groups (ERGs) worldwide.

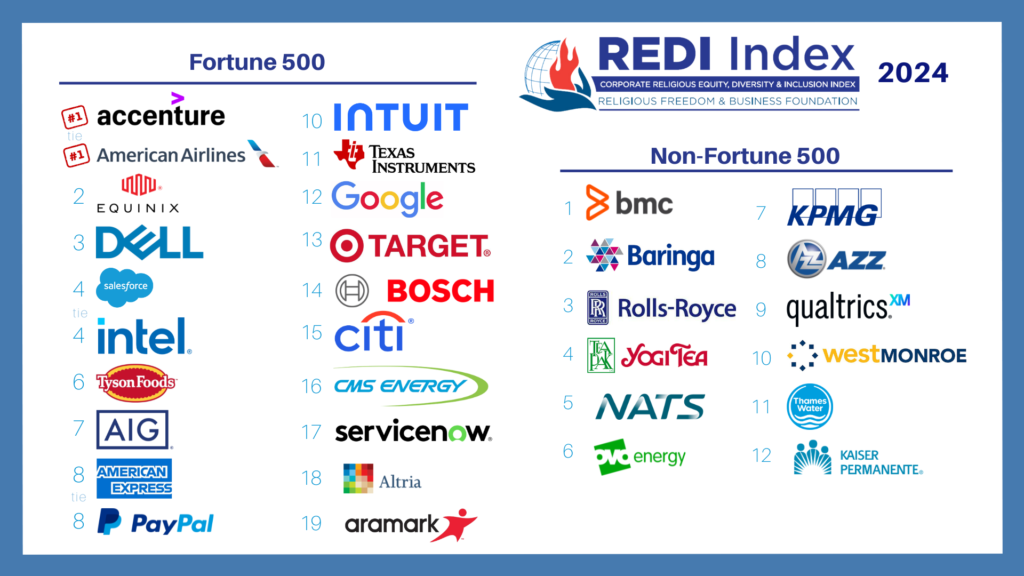
REDI Index 2024.

== History ==
In 2014 the foundation was established by Brian J. Grim.

== Methodology ==
RFBF's Researches produces open publications on the relationship between religion and economic activity, contributing to broader academic and policy discussions on religion’s role in society on a body of scholarship by it founder and collaborators on religious demography, regulation of religion, and global religious trends that have been cited in policy and nonprofit discussions highlighting religion as a contributor to national economies.

Religious Equity, Diversity & Inclusion (REDI) Index is an initiative that evaluates companies corporative policies and practices related to religious inclusion in the workplace and has been referenced in reporting on the growing role of religion in corporate belonginf programs, including the expansion of faith-based employee resource groups and accommodation policies.

Dare to Overcome (DTO) is a conference series that focuses on religion in the workplace and interfaith collaboration in business contexts to discuss religious inclusion and workplace practices being recognized as a broader international religious best practice in civil participation engagement with its forums like the International Religious Freedom (IRF) Builders Forum.

Training and workplace engagement provided by the foundation develops training and advisory services related to religion in the workplace, including guidance on religious accommodation and inclusion so reflecting workplace trends in which employers are increasingly addressing religion alongside other dimensions of employee identities.his approach aligns with wider public and policy discussions about religion’s role in workplace expression and employee rights.

== Recognition ==
RFBF's focus on the intersection of religion and business on the international markets that associates it with economic outcomes and societal stability led the nonpartisan religious role in the workplace promotion organization to be recognized by the World Economic Forum (WEF), influence the Fortune 500, and be used by the G20 Interfaith Forum (IF20).

== See also ==
- Freedom of religion or belief (FoRB)
- Workplace diversity
- Diversity, equity, and inclusion (DEI)
