= FBI Special Advisor Program =

The FBI Special Advisor Program is an internal consulting and leadership development rotational program of the Federal Bureau of Investigation (FBI). The group consists of recent graduates from the top Master of Business Administration (MBA) programs. FBI special advisors are primarily responsible for serving in an advisory capacity to the FBI Senior Executive team and completing "management" type of issues.

== History ==
The FBI Special Advisor Program evolved from a 2002 effort by the FBI's Finance Division to recruit new talent from top business schools. Initially, one graduate of Harvard Business School was hired to work in the Director's Office. In 2003, another Harvard Business School graduate joined the FBI to work for the chief financial officer. The work of these two merited the attention of the FBI's senior leadership and led to a proposal for a formal business school recruiting program. In 2007, executives from 25 FBI divisions participated in the three-year-old Special Advisor Program.

=== Past responsibilities ===
In the past, the FBI special advisors have been responsible for:

- implementing the balanced scorecard strategic planning tool at the FBI,
- restructuring the 1000-employee Human Resources division to achieve improvements in productivity and customer service,
- coordinating the development of an information technology (IT) system for managing crises and special events,
- re-engineering the background investigation process to improve time-to-hire for new FBI employees,
- leading a team to develop and implement a career path, training and development for the FBI's Intelligence Analyst workforce,
- developing a leadership development strategy and succession planning model, and
- implementing a consolidated contract for relocation services, resulting in a US$38 million savings
