= Hugh Grant (business executive) =

Scottish business executive

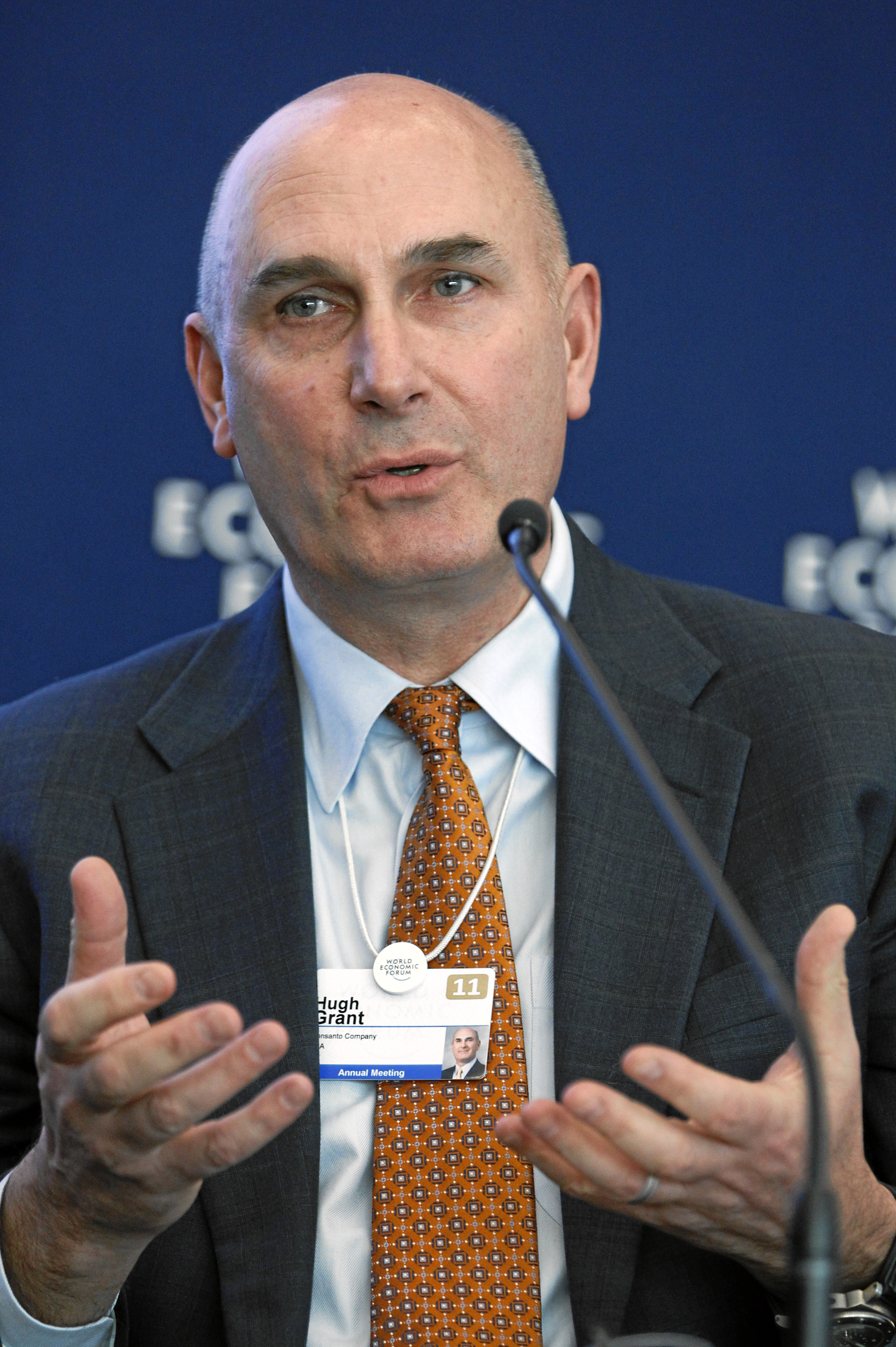
- Hugh Grant in 2011
- Born: 23 March 1958 (age 68); Larkhall, Scotland, UK
- Education: University of Glasgow; University of Edinburgh; International Management Centre
- Occupation: Businessman
- Spouse: Janice Grant

Hugh Grant (born 23 March 1958) is a Scottish business executive, who was the last CEO of Monsanto until its acquisition by Bayer.

== Early life ==
Grant was born in Larkhall, Scotland. He received a bachelor's degree in agricultural zoology and molecular biology from the University of Glasgow, a postgraduate degree in agriculture from the University of Edinburgh, and an MBA from the International Management Centre in Buckingham, England.

== Career ==
He worked in Scotland from 1981 to 1991 for the then US-based Monsanto company and then was appointed global strategy director in the agriculture division, based in St. Louis, Missouri. In 1995, he became managing director for the company's Asia-Pacific region and in 1998, co-president of the agriculture division.

The 20th-century Monsanto Company, in the midst of a roughly five-year series of mergers and spin-offs (which had the effect of reducing its focus on chemicals in favor of biotechnology), legally ceased to exist in 2000. A new Monsanto Company was created and Grant became executive vice president and chief operating officer of this new Monsanto. In 2003, he became president and chief executive officer and joined the board of directors.

In March 2009, Grant was named one of the world's 30 most respected CEOs on Barron's annual list. He was named 2010 CEO of the Year by Chief Executive magazine. In 2009, Grant earned a total compensation of $10,803,757, which included a base salary of $1,391,356, a cash bonus of $1,070,382, stocks granted of $1,875,766, options granted of $5,902,039, and other compensation of $564,214.

He became a director of the Harris Distillery in 2014.

In March 2018, Grant announced that after Monsanto was acquired by Bayer, he would leave the company and he received a pay-off of approximately $77m post-sale.
