= Rosemary Stewart =

Rosemary Stewart may refer to:

- Rose Stone (Rosemary Stewart, born 1945), African-American singer and keyboardist
- Rosemary Stewart (business theorist) (1924–2015), British writer and researcher in business management and healthcare management
