= Elwood Holton =

Elwood F. Ed Holton III is the Jones S. Davis Distinguished Professor of Human Resource, Leadership, and Organization Development at Louisiana State University. He coordinates B.S., M.S., and Ph.D. degree programs in Human Resources Education and Leadership Development.

Holton also serves as Special Assistant to the Chancellor for Workforce Development at LSU, where he is leading the creation of a center for workforce studies. In 2002, he was named the Outstanding Human Resource Development Scholar by the Academy of Human Resource Development (AHRD). In 2004, he was inducted into the International Adult and Continuing Education Hall of Fame for his significant contributions to the field.

== Research fields ==
His research centers on workforce development policy, analysis, and evaluation of organizational learning and performance systems. He focuses on enhancing learning transfer systems, management and leadership development, and crafting HRD policy and strategy. As a Past-President and one of the 75 charter members of Academy of the Human Resource Development (AHRD), he dedicated 7 years to serving on the AHRD Board of Directors.

== Awards ==
His research has won numerous awards, including the Richard A. Swanson Research Excellence Award in 2008 from the Academy of Human Resource Development and six Citations of Excellence from ANBAR Management Intelligence.

== Books ==
- co-editor of Improving Learning Transfer Systems in Organizations (Jossey- Bass, 2003);
- co-author of Approaches to Training and Development (Perseus Publishing, 2003);
- co-author of Human Resource Development: Foundations of Theory and Practice (Berrett-Koehler, 2001);
- co-author of How to Succeed in Your First Job: Tips for New College Graduates, So You Are New Again: How to Succeed When You Change Jobs, and Helping Your New Employee Succeed: Tips for Managers of New College Graduates (Berrett-Koehler, 2001);
- co-author of The Adult Learner-5th ed. (Gulf Publishing, 1998);
- co-author of Results: How to Assess Performance, Learning, and Perceptions in Organizations (Berrett- Koehler, 1999);
- author of The Ultimate New Employee Survival Guide. (Petersons, 1998); co-editor of the HRD Research Handbook (Berrett-Koehler, 1997);
- editor of the case book Leading Change in Organizations (ASTD, 1997);
- co-editor of Conducting Needs Assessment (ASTD, 1995).
