= Stunted projective space =

In mathematics, a stunted projective space is a construction on a projective space of importance in homotopy theory, introduced by Ioan James (1959). Idea includes collapsing a part of conventional projective space to a point.

More concretely, in a real projective space, complex projective space or quaternionic projective space

$$\mathbb{KP}^n$$

where $\mathbb{K}$ can be either $\color{blue}{\mathbb{R}}$, $\color{blue}{\mathbb{C}}$ or $\color{blue}\mathbb{H}$. One can find (in many ways) copies of

$$\mathbb{KP}^m$$

where, $m < n$. The corresponding stunted projective space is then

$$\mathbb{KP}^{n,m} = \mathbb{KP}^n / \mathbb{KP}^m$$

where, the notation implies that the $\mathbb{KP}^m$ has been identified to a point. This makes a topological space that is no longer a manifold. The importance of this construction was realised when it was shown that real stunted projective spaces arose as Spanier–Whitehead duals of spaces of Ioan James, so-called quasi-projective spaces, constructed from Stiefel manifolds. Their properties were therefore linked to the construction of frame fields on spheres.

In this way the question on vector fields on spheres was reduced to a question on stunted projective spaces:

For $\mathbb{RP}^{n,m}$, is there a degree one mapping on the 'next cell up' (of the first dimension not collapsed in the stunting) that extends to the whole space?

Frank Adams showed that this could not happen, completing the proof.

In later developments spaces $\mathbb{KP}^{\infty,m}$ and stunted lens spaces have also been used.
