= Symmetric product =

Symmetric product may refer to:

- The product operation of a symmetric algebra
- The symmetric product of tensors
- The symmetric product of an algebraic curve
- The Symmetric product (topology), $\operatorname{SP}^n(X)$ or infinite symmetric product $\operatorname{SP}^\infty(X)$ of a space X in algebraic topology
