= Seeing the Big Picture =

2012 book by Kevin R. Cope

- Author: Kevin Cope
- Language: English
- Subject: Business acumen
- Genre: Business; Self-help
- Publisher: Greenleaf Book Group
- Publication date: March 2012
- Publication place: United States
- Media type: Print (hardcover); E-book
- Pages: 176
- ISBN: 978-1608322466

Seeing the Big Picture: Business Acumen to Build Your Credibility, Career, and Company is a 2012 self-help business book by Kevin Cope, founder of the training firm Acumen Learning. Published by Greenleaf Book Group, it covers the topic of business acumen.

== Synopsis ==
Cope writes that a deep understanding of a company can make its employees' work more fulfilling and purpose-driven by highlighting how they influence the success of their team, department, or organization. He presents what are described as five business drivers: cash, profit, assets, growth, and people. Cope argues that these are the building blocks of any business and contribute to its overall success.

== Reception ==
On March 25, 2012, Seeing the Big Picture reached number 4 on the New York Times Best Seller list in the "Hardcover Advice & Misc." category.

Steve Larson, for the Deseret News, said that "Cope's writing style and his ability to convey difficult business topics in relatable stories makes this book easy to understand." Publishers Weekly wrote that the book "reads like little more than an introduction to financial analysis", but said it would be helpful for those "looking to understand the general contours of a company’s dynamic, the parts that make it up, and the role each plays in the bigger picture." John Rodzvilla, for Library Journal, called Seeing the Big Picture "too introductory" for some readers, but recommended it to "lower-level managers who have begun to think about how they fit in a larger organization."
