= James embedding =

In mathematics, the James embedding is an embedding of a real, complex, or hyperbolic projective space into a sphere, introduced by Ioan James.
