= Revans University =

Educational institution in the UK

- The University of Action Learning
- Type: Unaccredited / Private online university
- Established: 1999
- Founder: International Management Centres Association (IMCA)
- President: Dr. Richard Teare
- Location: Port Vila (registered office); Boulder, Colorado (associated), Vanuatu / United States
- Campus: None (online-only)
- Partner organization: International Management Centres Association (IMCA)

Revans University, also known as The University of Action Learning (UAL), is the unaccredited degree-awarding body for the UK-based International Management Centres Association (IMCA or IMC Association). Revans University's registered address is in Port Vila, Vanuatu, though it has also been associated with Boulder, Colorado. It has no physical campus and all its activities take place online. As of 2005, Revans University's partner organization IMCA was based in Buckingham, UK. IMCA provides accreditation of the Action Learning program of Gaia University and possibly others. (See Accreditation below).

== Foundation ==
According to Revans University and IMCA's jointly-issued literature from 2004, IMCA founded Revans University in 1999 after IMCA's own degree programmes were about to be made illegal by the Education Reform Act 1988; IMCA made unsuccessful approaches to UK's Council for National Academic Awards and several universities in the UK and Australia before deciding to found Revans University in the US under IMCA's own sponsorship.

== Methods of study ==
Revans University and IMCA are proponents of action learning, pioneered by Reg Revans.

Rather than requiring a traditional thesis, Revans University and IMCA award doctoral degrees on the basis of an "explication" – a short, 10,000-word document describing a candidate's professional experience and original contributions to knowledge.

== Accreditation ==
Prior to 2005, Revans University and IMCA were accredited by the US Distance Education and Training Council (DETC), but this accreditation was removed by DETC in 2005. Neither Revans University nor IMCA is recognised as a UK degree-awarding body or course provider. As of 22 May 2021, neither Revans University nor IMCA have regained certification by DEAC (former DETC)

According to The Times Educational Supplement, British universities are not accepting qualifications accredited by Revans University; this has led to complaints from former students.

Gaia University states that its degree programmes are accredited through "International Management Centres(IMC) of the UK and New Zealand".

Gaia University States in its Living Mandala website: "IMC, through its wholly owned Revans University, is authorized by the Education Reform Act of 1988 and its amendments to grant degrees in the UK."

== Notable alumni ==
- Merilyn Tahi - women's rights activist
- Paul McKenna - British hypnotist

== See also ==
- Reg Revans
- Action learning
- Unaccredited institutions of higher education
