= Acton Society Trust =

UK think tank

The Acton Society Trust was established by the Joseph Rowntree Social Service Trust in the 1940s "to analyse the implications of the welfare state for liberty and the individual.

It paid for assistants to front bench politicians, now known as special political advisors, who were referred to as Chocolate Soldiers, until public money was provided for the purpose in 1974. It produced many of the earliest studies of management in the United Kingdom, particularly in the National Health Service.

It submitted evidence to the Committee on the Staffing of Local Government (Mallaby Committee) in 1966.

Directors of the organisation included Rosemary Stewart. Teddy Chester and Reg Revans both worked for the trust before moving to the University of Manchester, as did David Layton.

The Trust's archives are held at the London School of Economics.

It was closed down in 2000.

== Publications ==
- Nationalised Industry: 1, Accountability to Parliament, 1950
- Nationalised Industry: 2, The Powers of the Minister, 1950
- Accountability to Parliament, 1950
- The extent of centralisation: A discussion based on a case study in the coal industry (Nationalised industry series; nos. 6 & 7), 1951
- Training and promotion in nationalised industry, 1951
- Problems of Promotion Policy, 1951
- The Powers of the Minister, 1951
- The Miner's Pension, 1951
- The Men on the Boards. A Study of the Composition of the Boards of the Nationalised Industry, 1951
- The Framework of Joint Consultation, 1952
- The Workers Point of View. A Discussion of "Reporting Back" Based on a Study in a Coalfield, (Studies in nationalised industry series;no.11), 1952
- Patterns of Organisation, 1952
- The Future of the Unions, 1952
- Relations with the Public, 1952
- Management Under Nationalisation: Studies in Decentralisation, (prepared by T. E. Chester and J. H. Smith), 1953
- Background and blueprint: Hospital organisation and administration under the National Health Service (Hospitals and the State series; no.1), 1955
- Management succession: The recruitment, selection, training and promotion of managers, 1956
- The impact of the change: Hospital organisation and administration under the National Health Service (Hospitals and the state series;no.2),1956
- Groups, regions and committees: Hospital organisation and administration under the National Health Service (Hospitals and the state series; nos 3 and 4) 1957
- Creative leadership in a state service: A general survey (Hospitals and the state series)
- Size and morale, 1957
- The central control of the service (Hospitals and the state series;no.3), 1958
- Redundancy: A survey of problems and practices, 1958
- Wider shareholding, 1959
- Creative leadership in a state service: A general survey (Hospitals and the state series;no.6), 1959
- Retirement: A study of current attitudes and practices, 1960
- Management initiative, A report compiled by M. J. Kirton and others, 1961
- Buying better health – Colloquium on the Finance of National Health, 1961
- Childers Sort Out the Mixers (Case studies of management initiative), 1962
- The Reorganization of Childers Sales Methods (Case studies of management initiative), 1962
- The Childers Rosette Scheme (Case studies of management initiative), 1962
- No Sale for Childers Dryers (Case studies of management initiative), 1962
- Brent & Russell Buy a Subsidiary (Case studies of management initiative),1962
- The arts graduate in industry, 1962
- Mergers past and present, Randall Smith, 1963
- The human effects of mergers: the impact on managers; Rosemary Stewart, Pauline Wingate and Randal Smith, 1963
- Industry and the countryside: The impact of industry on amenities in the countryside:the report of a preliminary inquiry for the Royal Society of Arts 1963
- Land values: The report of the proceedings of a colloquium held in London on March 13 and 14, 1965 under the auspices of the Acton Society Trust, 1965
- Regionalism in England, 1965
- Town and county hall problems of recruitment and training by Trevor Smith, 1966
- The human effects of mergers: the impact on the shop floor, Dennis Brooks and Randall Smith, 1966
- Its Aims Work and Publications, 1967
- Sharing The Profits. An Inquiry Into The Habits, attitudes and Problems of Employees' Shareholding Schemes; Mr. Guy Naylor, 1968
- Acton essays, 1968
- Acton Society Studies. no. 1, etc., 1972
- Readings on Mergers and Takeovers, 1972, ISBN 9780236176199
- A Study of Liberty and Revolution, Goodman, Edward; 1975 ISBN 9780715608708
- What size should organisations be? Peter Abell, 1977
- How the economies of scale might benefit small units of spontaneous cooperation, E. Goodman, 1977
- Thoughts on the present discontents in Britain: a review and a proposal, Krishan Kumar, 1977
- Some relative efficiency and comparative institutional properties of markets and hierarchies, David J. Teece, 1977
- Hierarchy and democratic authority, Peter Abell, 1978
- Economic efficiency and the internal structure of the business enterprise: theory and evidence, Henry Ogden Armour and David J. Teece, 1978
- The concept of property; Iain Hampsher-Monk, 1978
- Information technology and the size of firms, R. K. Stamper, 1978
- Some reflections on information economics, Joseph E. Stiglitz, 1978
- Information and economic organisation, Joseph E. Stiglitz, 1978
- The contribution of small units of enterprise to the German economic miracle, Willibrord Sauer, 1979
- What welcome? reception and resettlement of refugees in Britain, Michael Levin, 1981 ISBN 0850000173
- The Scottish Office and nationalised industries, James F. Laing, 1982 ISBN 0850000181
- British politics in the post-Keynesian era, Trevor Smith, 1986 ISBN 085000022X
- Impacts And Influences; James Curran, Anthony Smith and Pauline Wingate, 1987, ISBN 9780416006124
