= Michael J. Marquardt =

American academic

Michael J. Marquardt is an American academic. He is a professor of Human Resource Development and International Affairs at George Washington University. He was the co-founder and first President of the World Institute of Action Learning (WIAL), a leading organization for certifying action learning coaches.

== Early life ==
Marquardt was born in Tigerton, Wisconsin on November 13, 1943. He received his doctorate in Human Resource Development from George Washington University and his master's and bachelor's degrees from Maryknoll College. Marquardt has done graduate work at Harvard, Columbia and the University of Virginia.

== Career ==
Marquardt held a number of senior management, training, and marketing positions with organizations such as Grolier, American Society for Training and Development, Association Management Inc., Overseas Education Fund, TradeTec, and U.S. Office of Personnel Management. Marquardt worked as a trainer and consultant in global organizations prior to joining the GWU faculty in 1991. He has trained more than 100,000 managers in nearly 150 countries since beginning his international experience in Spain in 1969.

== Publications ==
Over one million copies of his publications have been sold in nearly a dozen languages. Marquardt served as the Editor of the UNESCO Encyclopedia volume on Human Resources and is an editor and/or advisor for professional journals around the world. He has been a keynote speaker at international conferences in Australia, Japan, Philippines, Malaysia, South Africa, Singapore and India as well as throughout North America.

He is the author of 24 books and over 100 professional articles in the fields of leadership, learning, globalization and organizational change including:

=== Leading with Questions: How Leaders Find the Right Solutions by Knowing What to Ask ===
Revised in 2014, this work "draws on interviews with thirty leaders, including eight whose stories are new to this edition. These interviews tell stories from a range of countries, including Singapore, Guyana, Korea, and Switzerland, and feature case studies from prominent firms such as DuPont, Alcoa, Novartis, and Cargill. A chapter on problem-solving shows how to use questions as a leadership technique.

=== Building the Learning Organization: Achieving Strategic Advantage through a Commitment to Learning ===
Revised in 2011, this book "discusses how the collective genius of people working within an organization can be a motivating force. Marquardt illustrates how five subsystems—learning, organization, people, knowledge, and technology—come together to create the Systems Learning Organization model."

=== Optimizing the Power of Action Learning: Real-Time Strategies for Developing Leaders, Building Teams and Transforming Organizations ===
"By exploring key principles and best practices that move action learning from good to great, Marquardt highlights resources for transforming people, groups, organizations, and even entire communities. Calling upon his pioneering experiences and the fundamentals introduced in his bestseller Action Learning in Action, Marquardt delivers the next generation of tools and techniques to make action learning successful in any organization. This comprehensive guidebook builds on the real experiences of thousands of managers in hundreds of companies, explores recent innovations in the field, and demonstrates how the power of action learning can help any organization thrive in today’s fast-changing global marketplace."

=== Action Learning in Action: Transforming Problems and People for World-Class Organizational Learning ===
In one of his first books, Marquardt "provides field-tested tools to solve problems, develop individuals, and create organizational learning and success. Dr. Marquardt brings together six essential elements of Action Learning with realistic advice, practical wisdom, and such tools as checklists and a comprehensive glossary of terms. Readers can learn to leverage action learning to solve problems, develop employees, enhance personal growth, and create organizational learning."

== Other works ==
- Yeo, R. K., & Marquardt, M. J. (2012). Complex problem solving through action learning: implications for human resource development. International Journal of Human Resources Development and Management, 12(4), 258-273.
- Marquardt, M. J. (2011). Leading with questions: How leaders find the right solutions by knowing what to ask.
- Soffe, S. M., Marquardt, M. J., & Hale, E. (2011). Action learning and critical thinking: a synthesis of two models. Action Learning: Research and Practice, 8(3), 211-230.
- Marquardt, M., Ng, S.S., and Goldson, H. (2010). Team Development via Action Learning. Advances in Developing Human Resources, 12(2),241-259.
- Marquardt, M. and Banks, S. (2010). Theory to Practice: Action Learning. Advances in Developing Human Resources, 12(2), 159-162.
- Marquardt, M. (2009). Action Learning for Higher Education Institutions. Kuala Lumpur: AKEPT Press.
- Marquardt, M. and Ceriani, A. (2009) Action Learning: Principi, Metodo, Casi (2009). Milano: FrancoAngeli.
- Marquardt, M., H. Skipton Leonard, Arthur M. Freedman, Claudia C. Hill. Action Learning for Developing Leaders and Organizations: Principles, Strategies, and Cases. New York: Harcourt & Brace, 2009.
- Marquardt, Michael J. and Loan, P. (2006). Manager as Mentor. Westport, CT: Praeger Press.
- Marquardt, M. "Leading with Questions." Leadership Excellence, 2006.
- Marquardt, M. "Action Learning." In Experiential Handbook (Mel Silverman, ed.). San Francisco: Jossey-Bass, 2006.
- Marquardt, M. Leading with Questions: How Leaders Find the Right Solutions by Knowing What to Ask. San Francisco: Jossey-Bass, 2006.
- Marquardt, M. Optimizing the Power of Action Learning. Palo Alto: Davies-Black Press, 2004. (Also translated and published in Japanese, Thai, Italian, Chinese, Portuguese, and Korean). Selected as Book of the Year by the Academy of HRD.
- Marquardt, M. "Harnessing the Power of Action Learning." Training and Development, 8 (6), 26-32, 2004.
- Marquardt M. "Developing Global Leaders via Action Learning Programs: A Case Study at Boeing." Thai Journal of Public Administration, vol. 3, no. 3, 133-157, 2009.
- Marquardt, M. "Learning to Think and Lead Globally at Boeing - Developing Global Leaders via Action Learning Programs." Proceedings of the Academy of HRD, Minneapolis, 2003.
- Marquardt, M. "Action Learning" in Performance Intervention Maps. Alexandria: ASTD Press, 2001.
- Marquardt, M. "Action Learning: The Cornerstone for Building a Learning Organization" in Fuhrungsstarke oder Charisma. Frankfurt: Peter Lang Press, 2001.
- Marquardt, M. "Action Learning and Leadership." The Learning Organization, vol.7, no. 5, 233-240, 2000.
- Marquardt, M. "Action Learning." in The Resource Guide to Performance Interventions. San Francisco: Jossey-Bass, 1999.
- Marquardt, M. "Action Learning in Action: Transforming Problems and People for World-Class Organizational Learning". Palo Alto: Davies-Black Press, 1999.
- Marquardt, M. "Using Action Learning with Multicultural Groups." Performance Improvement Quarterly. Vol. 11, No. 1, 112-127, 1998.

== Recognition ==
- International Practitioner of the Year Award from the American Society for Training and Development
- Scholar of the Year Award from the Academy of Human Resource Development.
- Honorary doctoral degrees from universities in Asia, Europe, and North America.
