= Chief Executive (magazine) =

Business magazine published by Chief Executive Group

- Editor: Dan Bigman
- Categories: Business Magazine
- Frequency: Bi-Monthly
- Circulation: 42,025
- Founded: 1976
- Company: Chief Executive Group, LLC
- Country: United States
- Based in: Stamford, CT
- Language: English
- Website: chiefexecutive.net
- ISSN: 0160-4724

Chief Executive is an American business magazine published by Chief Executive Group, LLC. It covers the "CEO community" in the United States, featuring notable business leaders and other stories related to the C-suite.

== Description ==
Chief Executive began publication in 1976. The magazine is published four times a year and has a circulation of 42,000 copies. It is audited twice yearly by BPA Worldwide. Chief Executive began publishing its magazine online in 1998.

Each May, the magazine publishes its "Best and Worst States for Business" rankings, based on survey results from its CEO readership base. CEOs grade the states on taxes and regulation, the quality of the work force and living environment, among other categories. The 2011 rankings elicited a friendly political feud between Florida Governor Rick Scott and Texas Governor Rick Perry, whose states ranked third and first, respectively.

Chief Executive features a "CEO of the Year" award. Past recipients include Bob Ulrich, Anne Mulcahy, Hugh Grant,Alan Mulally,Marc Benioff,and Greg Brown.
