= Human Resource Development Review =

Human Resource Development Review (HRDR)
- Discipline: Human resources
- Language: English
- Edited by: Yonjoo Cho

Publication details
- History: 2002-present
- Publisher: SAGE Publications
- Frequency: Quarterly
- Impact factor: 2.765 (2020)

Standard abbreviations
- ISO 4: Hum. Resour. Dev. Rev.

Indexing
- ISSN: 1534-4843 (print); 1552-6712 (web)
- LCCN: 2001214173
- OCLC no.: 423784671

Links
- Journal homepage; Online archive

Human Resource Development Review (HRDR) is an international quarterly peer-reviewed academic journal whose main goal is to promote theory and theory building in human resource development (HRD) and related fields. To accomplish the goal, HRDR seeks to publish four basic types of refereed articles: theory and conceptual articles, integrative literature reviews, theory-building research methods, and foundations of HRD. This journal is a member of the Committee on Publication Ethics (COPE). It is currently published by SAGE Publications. Effective August 1, 2020, the editorial team consists of Editor-in-Chief Dr. Yonjoo Cho (the University of Texas at Tyler), along with Associate Editors: Drs. Meera Alagaraja from the University of Louisville, Julie Davies from Manchester Metropolitan University in the U.K., Hyung Joon Yoon from the Pennsylvania State University, Managing Editor Zandra W. Bosie from the University of Texas at Tyler. The current impact factor for HRDR, as of 2020, is 2.765.

HRDR was established in 2002 under the editorship of Dr. Elwood Holton. Since its inaugural issue in 2002, there have been a total of six former editors: Drs. Elwood Holton, Richard Torraco, Tom Reio, Jamie Callahan, Julia Storberg-Walker, and Jia Wang. We welcome thoughtful, meaningful, critical, and high quality theoretical, conceptual, and review articles that support theory building and that provide implications for HRD research and practice.

== Abstracting and indexing ==
Human Resource Development Review is abstracted and indexed in:

- ABI - Authority in Business Research
- ERIC
- NISC
- PsycINFO
- Scopus
- Wilson Business Periodicals Index/Wilson Business Abstracts
- Zetoc
