= Richard A. Swanson =

American organizational theorist

Richard A. Swanson (born 1942) is an American organizational theorist and Distinguished Research Professor of Human Resource Development and the Sam Lindsey Chair at the University of Texas at Tyler (UTT), known for his synthesis work on the financial research related to human resource development.

== Biography ==
Swanson was born in 1942. He received a B.A. at The College of New Jersey in 1964 and a M.A. in 1966. In 1968 he received an Ed.D. from the University of Illinois.

Swanson has worked at the University of Minnesota from 1979 until 2005, and since 2005 as professor emeritus of Human Resource Development and Adult Education at the University of Minnesota in St. Paul. He is also professor emeritus at the University of Illinois at Urbana-Champaign. Since 2006 Swanson is a Distinguished Research Professor of Human Resource Development and the Sam Lindsey Chair at the College of Business and Technology at the University of Texas at Tyler.

Swanson has been organizationally active for a long time. In 1968 he initiated and directed an effort by the Department of Industrial Education in recruiting disadvantaged undergraduates from Ohio's center cities. Among three dozen other activities, he has been president of the Academy of Human Resource Development (AHRD), and at the end of 2007 he chaired UTT's HRD Faculty Search Committee.

Swanson is founding editor of Advances in Developing Human Resources, a scholarly journal sponsored by AHRD, and founding editor of the Human Resource Development Quarterly, the research journal of AHRD and the American Society for Training and Development.

Swanson was awarded in 1993 by the American Society for Training and Development, a national award for his scholarly contributions to the profession. In 1995 the Society named their annual award for the outstanding manuscript in each volume of the HRDQ after Swanson. He received an Outstanding HRD Scholar Award in 2000, in 2001 by the AHRD and received the Distinguished Alumni Award from the University of Illinois College of Education.

== Publications ==
Swanson has written and co-authored some seven books and more than 200 articles and other publications. A selection:

- 1988. Forecasting Financial Benefits of Human Resource Development
- 1990. Performance appraisal : perspectives on a quality management approach. With Gary N. McLean, and Susan R. Damme, editors.
- 1996. Analysis for Improving Performance: Tools for Diagnosing Organizations and Documenting Workplace Expertise.
- 1999. Results: How to Assess Performance, Learning, and Perceptions in Organizations
- 2001. Foundations of Human Resource Development
- 2001. Assessing the Financial Benefits of Human Resource Development
- 2005. The Adult Learner
- 2005. Research in Organizations.
- 2007. Analysis for improving performance : tools for diagnosing organizations and documenting workplace expertise
