= Business acumen =

Ability to handle business situations

Business acumen, also known as business savviness, business sense or business understanding, encompasses a combination of knowledge, skills, abilities, and experience that enable individuals to comprehend an organization's operations, functions, and external environment. This proficiency enables the use of business tools and analytical methods to assess situations, make informed decisions, align initiatives with the organization's strategy, and achieve desired outcomes. It is also defined as "keenness and quickness in understanding and dealing with a business situation (risks and opportunities) in a manner that is likely to lead to a good outcome". It involves having a "big picture" view of the business, financial literacy, strategic thinking, problem-solving, and effective communication.

The UK government considers business acumen to be a skill required by civil service staff with responsibilities in a contract management role. Additionally, business acumen is viewed as having emerged as a vehicle for improving financial performance and leadership development. Consequently, several types of strategies have developed around improving business acumen.

== Characteristics ==
=== Executive level thinking ===
In his 2012 book Seeing the Big Picture, Business Acumen to Build Your Credibility, Career, and Company, Kevin R. Cope states an individual who possesses business acumen views the business with an "executive mentality", with the ability to comprehend how the moving parts of a company work together to make to ensure success, and how financial metrics like profit margin, cash flow, and stock price reflect how well each of those moving parts is doing its job. Cope proposes that an individual who has the following five abilities could be described as someone having a strong sense of business acumen:

1. Seeing the "big picture" of the organization—how the key drivers of the business relate to each other, work together to produce profitable growth, and relate to the job
2. Understand important company communications and data, including financial statements
3. Use knowledge to make good decisions
4. Understand how actions and decisions impact key company measures and leadership objectives
5. Effectively communicate ideas to other employees, managers, executives, and the public.

=== Distinguishing traits ===
Raymond R. Reilly of the Ross School of Business at the University of Michigan and Gregory P. Reilly of the University of Connecticut document traits that individuals with business acumen possess:

- An acute perception of the dimensions of business issues
- Ability to make sense out of complexity and an uncertain future
- Cognizance of the implications of a choice for all the affected parties
- Decisive
- Flexibility for further change if warranted in the future

Thus, developing stronger business acumen means a more thoughtful analysis, clearer logic underlying business decisions, closer attention to key dimensions of implementation and operation, and more disciplined performance management. The ability to manage complexity also figures in the UK government's description of a business acumen attribute.

=== Financial literacy ===
Financial literacy is a comprehensive understanding of the drivers of growth, profitability, and cash flow; an organization's financial statements; key performance measures; and the implications of decisions on value creation.

Financial literacy is necessary, but not sufficient, to establish business acumen. According to Perth Leadership Institute,

Business acumen is based primarily on behavioral and experiential factors, not on formal learning or education such as financial literacy. [...] Financial literacy is almost never the need for senior managers and high potentials. [...] The real need for these managers is to understand how their actions and behaviors impact their financial decision-making [and] financial outcomes at both the unit and corporate levels.

=== Business management and leadership ===
Bob Selden observed a complementary relationship between business acumen and leadership. According to Selden, this relationship comprises the importance of nurturing both the development of strategic skills and that of good leadership and management skills in order for business leaders to achieve effectiveness.

According to a study titled Business acumen: a critical concern of modern leadership development: Global trends accelerate the move away from traditional approaches, traditional leadership development approaches, which are said to rely on personality and competency assessments as the scientific core of their approach, are failing. The study's intended goal is reportedly to demonstrate the importance of business acumen in leadership development approaches. According to the study, business acumen is projected to have an increasing impact on leadership development and HR agendas. Research into this relationship resulted in the creation of the Perth Leadership Outcome Model, which links financial outcomes to individual leadership traits.

In a study that interviewed 55 global business leaders, business acumen was cited as the most critical competency area for global leaders.

In their 2011 book, The Leadership Pipeline, Ram Charan, Stephen Drotter, and James Noel study the process and criteria for selecting a group manager, and suggest that the process and criteria are similar for selecting a CEO. According to them an obvious criterion for selecting a leader is well-developed business acumen.

Organizations with a strong base of business knowledge are more likely to develop leaders capable of motivating others and improving overall performance..

== Development ==
Programs designed to improve an individual or group's business acumen have supported the recognition of the concept as a significant topic in the corporate world. Executive Development Associates' 2009/2010 survey of Chief Learning Officers, Senior Vice Presidents of Human Resources, and Heads of Executive and Leadership Development listed business acumen as the second most significant trend in executive development. A 2011 report explores the impact of business acumen training on an organization in terms of intangibles and more tangible expressions of value. The findings support the notion that business acumen is a learned skill — developed on the job by learning the required skills from knowledge mentors while working in different employment positions. They also suggest that the learning process ranges widely, from structured internal company training programs, to an individual's self-chosen moves from one position to another.

The combination of these reports and surveys indicates that business acumen is a learned skill of increasing importance within the corporate world. There are different types of business acumen development programs available:

=== Business simulations ===
A business simulation is another corporate development tool used to increase business acumen. Several companies offer business simulations as a way to educate mid-level managers and non-financial leaders within their organization on cash flow and financial-decision-making processes. Their forms can vary from computer simulations to boardgame-style simulations. While offering an interactive learning experience, the extent to which these simulations replicate the complexities and pressures of real-world business scenarios remains questionable. Furthermore, the lack of behavioral baselines prevents the measurement of any tangible behavioral impact on participants. Critics also argue that the artificial nature of many simulations limits their real-world relevance.

=== Psychological assessments ===
The advent of personal assessments for business acumen is based in the emerging theories of behavioral finance and attempts to correlate innate personality traits with positive financial outcomes. This method approaches business acumen not as entirely based in either knowledge or experience, but on the combination of these and other factors which comprise an individual's financial personality or "signature".
