= Wilson Sutherland =

British mathematician (1935–2019)

- 2004 painting by Jennifer Anderson
- Born: Wilson Alexander Sutherland; 26 September 1935; Forres, County of Moray, Scotland
- Died: 7 October 2019 (aged 84); Heversham, Cumbria, England
- Education: University of St Andrews (MA); University of Oxford (DPhil)
- Scientific career
- Fields: Algebraic topology
- Institutions: University of Oxford; University of Manchester
- Thesis: Theory and Applications of Algebraic Topology (1963)
- Doctoral advisors: J. H. C. Whitehead; Ioan James

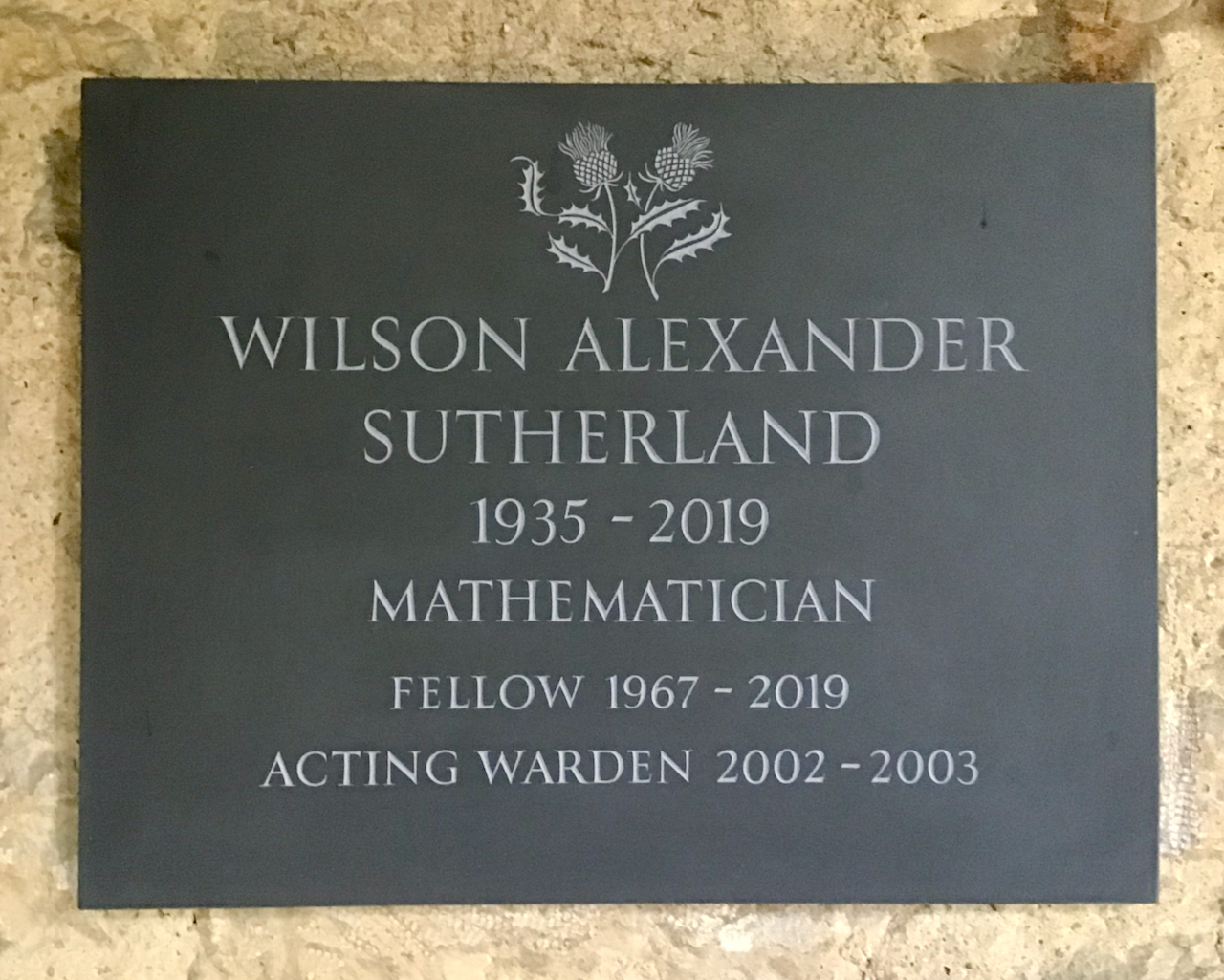
Plaque in New College, Oxford

Wilson Alexander Sutherland (26 September 1935 – 7 October 2019) was a British mathematician at the University of Oxford.

Sutherland earned a doctorate at the University of Oxford in 1963 under the joint supervision of J. H. C. Whitehead and Ioan James, with a dissertation in algebraic topology. He was, for many years, a lecturer in mathematics at Oxford, and a mathematics tutor at New College. He also taught at the Massachusetts Institute of Technology and the University of Manchester, and, as a visiting professor, at Yale University and the University of Aberdeen.

Sutherland died at his home in Heversham, Cumbria on 7 October 2019 at the age of 84.

== Publications ==
- Sutherland, Wilson A. (1975). Introduction to Metric and Topological Spaces. Oxford, England: Clarendon Press. ISBN 978-0-19-853161-6. OCLC 1679102. 2nd edition, 2009, ISBN 978-0-19-956308-1
- Crabb, Michael C.; Sutherland, Wilson A. (2000). "Counting Homotopy Types of Gauge Groups". Proceedings of the London Mathematical Society. 81 (3): 747–768. doi:10.1112/S0024611500012545. MR 1781154.
