= Teddy Chester =

Professor at Manchester University (1908–1990)

Teddy Chester (1908–1990) was the first professor of Social Administration at Manchester University.

He was Jewish, born in Austria and came to England in 1938 with his brother, who was a dentist.

He was recruited to the university in 1955 having previously worked at the Acton Society Trust and the extramural department of University of Oxford. He directed the Manchester Health Service Management Unit from then until he retired in 1975, though he continued to work at the university on management training for clinicians until his death. He worked with Reg Revans who was appointed at the same time. He was involved with the foundation of the National Training Scheme for Hospital Administrators from 1961. Manchester Business School instituted an annual lecture in his memory in 2005.

He was a member of the Advisory Council on Management Efficiency for the NHS and was involved in the formation of the Manchester Business School in 1965.

== Publications ==
- Management under nationalisation: studies in decentralisation, Acton Society 1953
- The Future of Nationalization (with HA Clegg), Oxford: Blackwell 1955
- Wage Policy and the Health Service, Oxford: Blackwell 1957
- The Social Sciences and the Changing Role of Management. Their Impact on Education for Management, OECD Lisbon, 1959
- Standards for Morale, Oxford University Press 1963
