= James reduced product =

In topology, a branch of mathematics, the James reduced product or James construction J(X) of a topological space X with given basepoint e is the quotient of the disjoint union of all powers X, X^{2}, X^{3}, ... obtained by identifying points (x_{1},...,x_{k−1},e,x_{k+1},...,x_{n}) with (x_{1},...,x_{k−1}, x_{k+1},...,x_{n}). In other words, its underlying set is the free monoid generated by X (with unit e). It was introduced by Ioan James (1955).

For a connected CW complex X, the James reduced product J(X) has the same homotopy type as ΩΣX, the loop space of the suspension of X.

The commutative analogue of the James reduced product is called the infinite symmetric product.
