= Rosemary Stewart (business theorist) =

Rosemary Stewart (20 December 1924 – 15 June 2015) was a British researcher and writer on business management and healthcare management.

Stewart was born in London but the family later moved to Pulborough, West Sussex. Most of her schooling was in Saskatoon, Canada, where her mother had relatives. She graduated in Economics from the University of British Columbia, Vancouver, then in 1945, after the end of the Second World War, returned to England.

She received a doctorate in Management Studies from the London School of Economics, and in 1956 became a researcher for the Acton Society, an independent organisation studying management of the newly nationalised industries and the health service; she rose to become a director of the society.

Formerly a Fellow in Organisational Behaviour at Templeton College, Oxford, she was appointed an Honorary Fellow of that college. Her research covered a range of subjects and organisations in industry, commerce and the National Health Service England and Wales (NHS). She ran workshops for many years for NHS chief executives and chairs. She lectured in many parts of the world. She was dean of the Oxford Centre for Management Studies from 1983 to 1985, and director of the Oxford Health Care Management Institute on its foundation in 1996.

Stewart was the author of more than a dozen books on management, and she edited books and numerous articles in academic and practitioner journals in the areas of general management, managerial behaviour and healthcare management.

She was granted the Honorary Degree of Doctor of Philosophy by Uppsala University in Sweden, and in 2008 gained membership of the Royal Society of Medicine.

Stewart married in 1961 Ioan Mackenzie James, a fellow of St John's College, Oxford, and they settled in that city. She died on 15 June 2015 at the age of 90.

== Bibliography ==
- The Boss: The Life and Times of the British Businessman, with Roy Lewis, Phoenix House, London, 1958. Revised and enlarged edition 1960.
- The Reality of Management William Heinemann, 1963, 3rd edition, Butterworth Heinemann, 1997
- Managers and their Jobs, 1967, Macmillan, 2nd ed. 1988, ISBN 0-333-45592-4, paperback 0-333-45593-2.
- How Computers affect Management, Macmillan, 1971, ISBN 0-333-12190-2
- The Reality of Organizations, 1972, Pan Macmillan. 3rd edition, 1993 ISBN 0-330-23249-5
- Contrasts in Management McGraw Hill, (UK), 1976 – John Player Award.
- Choices for the Manager Prentice-Hall, 1982 ISBN 0-13-133173-6
- Leading in the NHS: A Practical Guide, Macmillan, 1989.
- Managing in Britain and Germany, with Jean-Louis Barsoux, Alfred Kieser, Han-Dieter Ganter, and Peter Walgenbach, Macmillan, St.Martin's Press, 1994 ISBN 0-333-60646-9
- The Diversity of Management: Twelve Managers Talking, with Jean-Louis Barsoux, Macmillan, 1994, ISBN 0-333-58574-7
- Evidence-based Management: A practical guide for health professionals Radcliffe Medical Press. ISBN 1-85775-458-1
- Managerial Work (History of Management Thought) Ashgate (Aldershot, England), Rosemary Stewart (ed)
- Evidence-based Management 2003 ISBN 0-9579876-2-5
- Managing in Britain and Germany 1994, Jean-Louis Barsoux, et al.
- Woman in a Man's World
- The Diversity of Management, with Jean-Louis Barsoux
- Managing today and tomorrow
