= Ioan James =

British mathematician (1928–2025)

Ioan James FRS
- Born: 23 May 1928; Croydon, Surrey, England
- Died: 21 February 2025 (aged 96)
- Education: St Paul's, The Queen's, Oxford
- Awards: Berwick Prize (1959); Senior Whitehead Prize (1978)
- Scientific career
- Doctoral advisor: J. H. C. Whitehead
- Doctoral students: Jim Stasheff; Wilson Sutherland; Michael J. Hopkins

Ioan Mackenzie James FRS (23 May 1928 – 21 February 2025) was a British mathematician working in the field of topology, particularly in homotopy theory.

== Life and career ==
James was born in Croydon, Surrey, England, and was educated at St Paul's School, London and Queen's College, Oxford. In 1953 he earned a D. Phil. from the University of Oxford for his thesis entitled Some problems in algebraic topology, written under the direction of J. H. C. Whitehead.

In 1957 he was appointed reader in pure mathematics, a post which he held until 1969. From 1959 until 1969 he was a senior research fellow at St John's College, Oxford. He held the Savilian Chair of Geometry at the University of Oxford from 1970 to 1995. He was a professor emeritus, and later an honorary fellow of St John's.

He was elected a Fellow of the Royal Society in 1968. In 1978 the London Mathematical Society awarded him the Senior Whitehead Prize, which was established in honour of his doctoral supervisor, Whitehead. In 1984 he became President of the London Mathematical Society.

James married Rosemary Stewart, a writer and researcher in business management and healthcare management, in 1961. She died in 2015, aged 90. James died on 21 February 2025, aged 96.

== Books ==
- Ioan James, Topologies and Uniformities (Springer Undergraduate Mathematics Series), Springer, 1999.
- Ioan James, Remarkable Mathematicians, From Euler to von Neumann, Cambridge University Press, 2002.
- Ioan James, Remarkable Physicists: From Galileo to Yukawa, Cambridge University Press, 2004.
- Ioan James, Asperger's Syndrome And High Achievement: Some Very Remarkable People, Jessica Kingsley Pub, 2005.
- Ioan James, Michael Fitzgerald, The Mind of the Mathematician, JHU Press, 2007.
- Ioan James, Driven to Innovate: A Century of Jewish Mathematicians and Physicists, Peter Lang Oxford, 2009.
- Ioan James, Remarkable Biologists: From Ray to Hamilton, Cambridge University Press, 2009.
- Ioan James, Remarkable Engineers: From Riquet to Shannon, Cambridge University Press, 2010.

== See also ==
- James embedding
- James reduced product
