= Symmetric product (topology) =

In algebraic topology, the n^{th} symmetric product of a topological space consists of the unordered n-tuples of its elements. If one fixes a basepoint, there is a canonical way of embedding the lower-dimensional symmetric products into the higher-dimensional ones. That way, one can consider the colimit over the symmetric products, the infinite symmetric product. This construction can easily be extended to give a homotopy functor.

From an algebraic point of view, the infinite symmetric product is the free commutative monoid generated by the space minus the basepoint, the basepoint yielding the identity element. That way, one can view it as the abelian version of the James reduced product.

One of its essential applications is the Dold-Thom theorem, stating that the homotopy groups of the infinite symmetric product of a connected CW complex are the same as the reduced homology groups of that complex. That way, one can give a homotopical definition of homology.

== Definition ==
Let X be a topological space and n ≥ 1 a natural number. Define the n^{th} symmetric product of X or the n-fold symmetric product of X as the space

$$\operatorname{SP}^n(X)= X^n/S_n.$$

Here, the symmetric group S_{n} acts on X^{n} by permuting the factors. Hence, the elements of SP^{n}(X) are the unordered n-tuples of elements of X. Write [x_{1}, ..., x_{n}] for the point in SP^{n}(X) defined by (x_{1}, ..., x_{n}) ∈ X^{n}.

Note that one can define the n^{th} symmetric product in any category where products and colimits exist. Namely, one then has canonical isomorphisms φ : X × Y → Y × X for any objects X and Y and can define the action of the transposition $(k\ k+1)\in S_n$ on X^{n} as $\operatorname{Id}^{k-1} \times \phi \times \operatorname{Id}^{n-k-1}$, thereby inducing an action of the whole S_{n} on X^{n}. This means that one can consider symmetric products of objects like simplicial sets as well. Moreover, if the category is cartesian closed, the distributive law X × (Y ∐ Z) ≅ X × Y ∐ X × Z holds and therefore one gets

$$\operatorname{SP}^n(X\amalg Y) = \coprod_{k=0}^n \operatorname{SP}^k(X)\times \operatorname{SP}^{n-k}(Y).$$

If (X, e) is a based space, it is common to set SP^{0}(X) = {e}. Further, X^{n} can then be embedded into X^{n+1} by sending (x_{1}, ..., x_{n}) to (x_{1}, ..., x_{n}, e). This clearly induces an embedding of SP^{n}(X) into SP^{n+1}(X). Therefore, the infinite symmetric product can be defined as

$$\operatorname{SP}(X)=\operatorname{colim}\operatorname{SP}^n(X).$$

A definition avoiding category theoretic notions can be given by taking SP(X) to be the union of the increasing sequence of spaces SP^{n}(X) equipped with the direct limit topology. This means that a subset of SP(X) is open if and only if all its intersections with the SP^{n}(X) are open. We define the basepoint of SP(X) as [e]. That way, SP(X) becomes a based space as well.

One can generalise this definition as well to pointed categories where products and colimits exist. Namely, in this case one has a canonical map X^{n} → X^{n+1}, induced by the identity X^{n} → X^{n} and the zero map X^{n} → X. So this results in a direct system of the symmetric products, too and one can therefore define its colimit as the infinite symmetric product.

== Examples ==
- SP^{n}(I) is the same as the n-dimensional standard simplex Δ^{n}, where I denotes the unit interval.
- SP^{n}(S^{1}) can be identified with the space of conjugacy classes of unitary n × n-matrices, where S^{1} is supposed to be the circle. This is because such a class is uniquely determined by the eigenvalues of an element of the class, all lying in S^{1}. At first, one can easily see that this space is homotopy-equivalent to S^{1}: As SP^{n} is a homotopy functor (see Properties), the space in question is homotopy-equivalent to SP^{n}(C − {0}). Consider the map SP^{n}(C − {0}) → P_{n} into the space P_{n} of polynomials over C of degree at most n, mapping [w_{1}, ..., w_{n}] to (z - w_{1}) ⋅⋅⋅ (z - w_{n}). This way, one can identify SP^{n}(C − {0}) with the space of monic polynomials of degree n having constant term different from zero, i.e. C^{n − 1} × (C − {0}), which is homotopy-equivalent to S^{1}. This implies that the infinite symmetric product SP(S^{1}) is homotopy-equivalent to S^{1} as well. However, one knows considerably more about the space SP^{n}(S^{1}). Namely, that the map
  $$\begin{align}
\qquad \operatorname{SP}^n(S^1)&\to S^1, \\ {\color{white} .}
[w_1,\dots,w_n]&\mapsto w_1\cdots w_n
\end{align}$$
  is a fibre bundle with fibre being homeomorphic to the (n − 1)-dimensional standard simplex ∆^{n−1}. It is orientable if and only if n is odd.
- SP(S^{2}) is homeomorphic to the infinite-dimensional complex projective space CP^{∞} as follows: The space CP^{n} can be identified with the space of nonzero polynomials of degree at most n over C up to scalar multiplication by sending a_{0} + ... + a_{n}z^{n} to the line passing through (a_{0}, ..., a_{n}). Interpreting S^{2} as the Riemann sphere C ∪ {∞} yields a map
  $$\begin{align}
\qquad f\colon (S^2)^n&\to \mathbf{CP}^n, \\
(a_1,\dots,a_n)&\mapsto (z+a_1)\cdots(z+a_n),
\end{align}$$
  where the possible factors z + ∞ are omitted. One can check that this map indeed is continuous. As f(a_{1}, ..., a_{n}) remains unchanged under permutation of the a_{i}'s, f induces a continuous bijection SP^{n}(S^{2}) → CP^{n}. But as both are compact Hausdorff spaces, this map is a homeomorphism. Letting n go to infinity shows that the assertion holds.

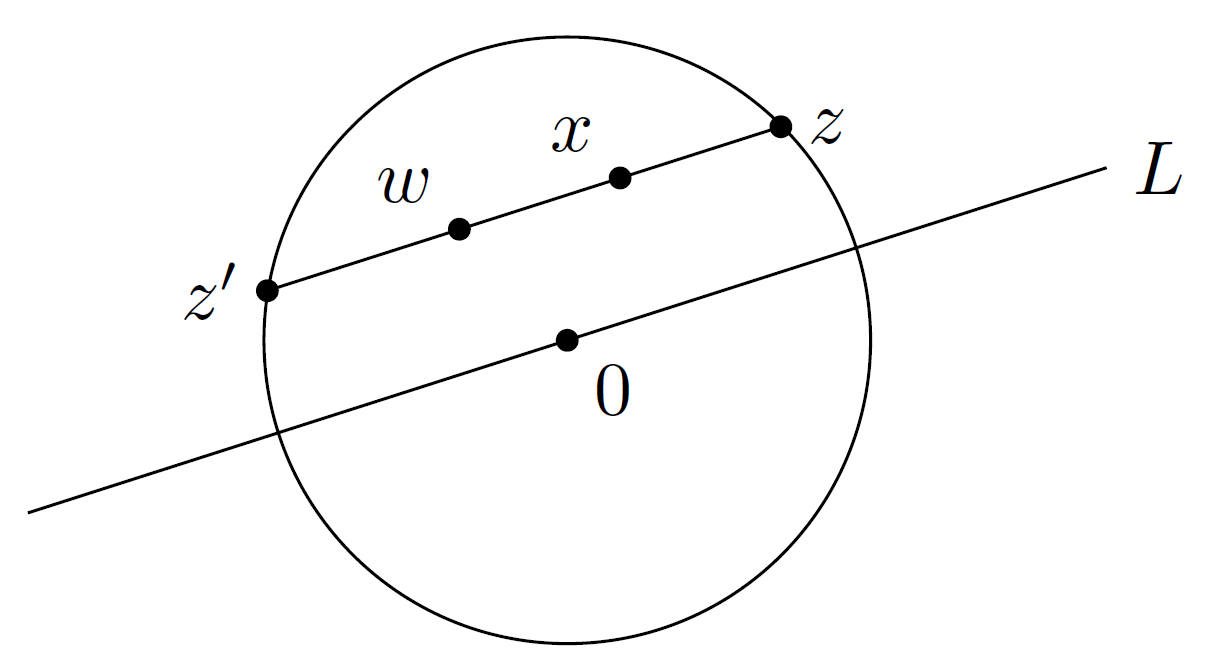

Although calculating SP(S^{n}) for n ≥ 3 turns out to be quite difficult, one can still describe SP^{2}(S^{n}) quite well as the mapping cone of a map Σ^{n}RP^{n-1} → S^{n}, where Σ^{n} stands for applying the reduced suspension n times and RP^{n−1} is the (n − 1)-dimensional real projective space: One can view SP^{2}(S^{n}) as a certain quotient of D^{n} × D^{n} by identifying S^{n} with D^{n}/∂D^{n}. Interpreting D^{n} × D^{n} as the cone on its boundary D^{n} × ∂D^{n} ∪ ∂D^{n} × D^{n}, the identifications for SP^{2} respect the concentric copies of the boundary. Hence, it suffices to only consider these. The identifications on the boundary ∂D^{n} × D^{n} ∪ D^{n} × ∂D^{n} of D^{n} × D^{n} itself yield S^{n}. This is clear as this is a quotient of D^{n} × ∂D^{n} and as ∂D^{n} is collapsed to one point in S^{n}. The identifications on the other concentric copies of the boundary yield the quotient space Z of D^{n} × ∂D^{n}, obtained by identifying (x, y) with (y, x) whenever both coordinates lie in ∂D^{n}. Define a map f: D^{n} × RP^{n−1} → Z by sending a pair (x, L) to (w, z). Here, z ∈ ∂D^{n} and w ∈ D^{n} are chosen on the line through x parallel to L such that x is their midpoint. If x is the midpoint of the segment zz′, there is no way to distinguish between z and w, but this is not a problem since f takes values in the quotient space Z. Therefore, f is well-defined. As f(x, L) = f(x, L′) holds for every x ∈ ∂D^{n}, f factors through Σ^{n}RP^{n−1} and is easily seen to be a homeomorphism on this domain.

== Properties ==
=== H-space structure ===
As SP(X) is the free commutative monoid generated by X − {e} with identity element e, it can be thought of as a commutative analogue of the James reduced product J(X). This means that SP(X) is the quotient of J(X) obtained by identifying points that differ only by a permutation of coordinates. Therefore, the H-space structure on J(X) induces one on SP(X) if X is a CW complex, making it a commutative and associative H-space with strict identity. As such, the Dold-Thom theorem implies that all its k-invariants vanish, meaning that it has the weak homotopy type of a generalised Eilenberg-MacLane space if X is path-connected. However, if X is an arbitrary space, the multiplication on SP(X) may fail to be continuous.

=== Functoriality ===
SP^{n} is a homotopy functor: A map f: X → Y clearly induces a map SP^{n}(f) : SP^{n}(X) → SP^{n}(Y) given by SP^{n}(f)[x_{1}, ..., x_{n}] = [f(x_{1}), ..., f(x_{n})]. A homotopy between two maps f, g: X → Y yields one between SP^{n}(f) and SP^{n}(g). Also, one can easily see that the diagram

commutes, meaning that SP is a functor as well. Similarly, SP is even a homotopy functor on the category of pointed spaces and basepoint-preserving homotopy classes of maps. In particular, X ≃ Y implies SP^{n}(X) ≃ SP^{n}(Y), but in general not SP(X) ≃ SP(Y) as homotopy equivalence may be affected by requiring maps and homotopies to be basepoint-preserving. However, this is not the case if one requires X and Y to be connected CW complexes.

=== Simplicial and CW structure ===
SP(X) inherits certain structures of X: For a simplicial complex X, one can also install a simplicial structure on X^{n} such that each n-permutation is either the identity on a simplex or a homeomorphism from one simplex to another. This means that one gets a simplicial structure on SP^{n}(X). Furthermore, SP^{n}(X) is also a subsimplex of SP^{n+1}(X) if the basepoint e ∈ X is a vertex, meaning that SP(X) inherits a simplicial structure in this case as well. However, X^{n} and SP^{n}(X) do not need to have the weak topology if X has uncountably many simplices. An analogous statement can be made if X is a CW complex. Nevertheless, it is still possible to equip SP(X) with the structure of a CW complex such that both topologies have the same compact sets if X is an arbitrary simplicial complex. So the distinction between the two topologies will not cause any differences for purposes of homotopy, e.g.

=== Homotopy ===
One of the main uses of infinite symmetric products is the Dold-Thom theorem. It states that the reduced homology groups coincide with the homotopy groups of the infinite symmetric product of a connected CW complex. This allows one to reformulate homology only using homotopy which can be very helpful in algebraic geometry. It also means that the functor SP maps Moore spaces M(G, n) to Eilenberg-MacLane spaces K(G, n). Therefore, it yields a natural way to construct the latter spaces given the proper Moore spaces.

It has also been studied how other constructions combined with the infinite symmetric product affect the homotopy groups. For example, it has been shown that the map

$$\rho\colon \operatorname{SP}(X)\to \Omega\operatorname{SP}(\Sigma X), \quad \rho[x_1,\dots,x_n](t) = [(x_1,t),\dots,(x_n,t)]$$

is a weak homotopy equivalence, where ΣX = X ∧ S^{1} denotes the reduced suspension and ΩY stands for the loop space of the pointed space Y.

=== Homology ===
Unsurprisingly, the homology groups of the symmetric product cannot be described as easily as the homotopy groups. Nevertheless, it is known that the homology groups of the symmetric product of a CW complex are determined by the homology groups of the complex. More precisely, if X and Y are CW complexes and R is a principal ideal domain such that H_{i}(X, R) ≅ H_{i}(Y, R) for all i ≤ k, then H_{i}(SP^{n}(X), R) ≅ H_{i}(SP^{n}(Y), R) holds as well for all i ≤ k. This can be generalised to Γ-products, defined in the next section.

For a simplicial set K, one has furthermore

$$H_*(\operatorname{SP}^{n+1}(K))\cong H_*(\operatorname{SP}^{n+1}(K),\operatorname{SP}^n(K)) \oplus H_*(\operatorname{SP}^n(K)).$$

Passing to geometric realisations, one sees that this statement holds for connected CW complexes as well. Induction yields furthermore

$H_*(\operatorname{SP}(K))\cong \bigoplus_{n=1}^\infty H_*(\operatorname{SP}^n(K),\operatorname{SP}^{n-1}(K)).$

== Related constructions and generalisations ==
S. Liao introduced a slightly more general version of symmetric products, called Γ-products for a subgroup Γ of the symmetric group S_{n}. The operation was the same and hence he defined X^{Γ} = X^{n}/Γ as the Γ-product of X. That allowed him to study cyclic products, the special case for Γ being the cyclic group, as well.

When establishing the Dold-Thom theorem, they also considered the "quotient group" Z[X] of SP(X). This is the free abelian group over X with the basepoint as the zero element. If X is a CW complex, it is even a topological group. In order to equip this group with a topology, Dold and Thom initially introduced it as the following quotient over the infinite symmetric product of the wedge sum of X with a copy of itself: Let τ : X ∨ X → X ∨ X be interchanging the summands. Furthermore, let ~ be the equivalence relation on SP(X ∨ X) generated by

$$x\sim x+y+\operatorname{SP}(\tau)(y)$$

for x, y ∈ SP(X ∨ X). Then one can define Z[X] as

$$\mathbb{Z}[X] = \operatorname{SP}(X\vee X)/\sim.$$

Since ~ is compatible with the addition in SP(X ∨ X), one gets an associative and commutative addition on Z[X]. One also has the topological inclusions X ⊂ SP(X) ⊂ Z[X] and it can easily be seen that this construction has properties similar to the ones of SP, like being a functor.

McCord gave a construction generalising both SP(X) and Z[X]: Let G be a monoid with identity element 1 and let (X, e) be a pointed set. Define

$$B(G,X) = \{ u\colon X\to G: u(e)=1 \text{ and } u(x)=1 \text{ for all but finitely many } x\in X \}.$$

Then B(G, X) is again a monoid under pointwise multiplication which will be denoted by ⋅. Let gx denote the element of B(G, X) taking the value g at x and being 1 elsewhere for g ∈ G, x ∈ X − {e}. Moreover, ge shall denote the function being 1 everywhere, the unit of B(G, X).

In order to install a topology on B(G, X), one needs to demand that X be compactly generated and that G be an abelian topological monoid. Define B_{n}(G, X) to be the subset of B(G, X) consisting of all maps that differ from the constant function 1 at no more than n points. B_{n}(G, X) gets equipped with the final topology of the map

$$\begin{align}
\mu_n\colon (G\times X)^n&\to B_n(G,X), \\
((g_1,x_1),\dots,(g_n,x_n))&\mapsto g_1x_1\cdots g_nx_n.
\end{align}$$

Now, B_{n}(G, X) is a closed subset of B_{n+1}(G, X). Then B(G, X) can be equipped with the direct limit topology, making it again a compactly generated space. One can then identify SP(X) respectively Z[X] with B(N, X) respectively B(Z, X).

Moreover, B(⋅,⋅) is functorial in the sense that B: C × D → C is a bifunctor for C being the category of abelian topological monoids and D being the category of pointed CW complexes. Here, the map B(φ, f) : B(G, X) → B(H, Y) for a morphism φ: G → H of abelian topological monoids and a continuous map f: X → Y is defined as

$$B(\varphi, f)(g_1x_1\cdots g_nx_n) = (\varphi g_1)(fx_1)\cdots (\varphi g_n)(fx_n)$$

for all g_{i} ∈ G and x_{i} ∈ X. As in the preceding cases, one sees that a based homotopy f_{t} : X → Y induces a homotopy B(Id, f_{t}) : B(G, X) → B(G, Y) for an abelian topological monoid G.

Using this construction, the Dold-Thom theorem can be generalised. Namely, for a discrete module M over a commutative ring with unit one has

$$[X,B(M,Y)]\cong \prod_{n=0}^\infty \tilde{H}^n(X,\tilde{H}_n(Y,M))$$

for based spaces X and Y having the homotopy type of a CW complex. Here, H̃_{n} denotes reduced homology and [X, Z] stands for the set of all based homotopy classes of basepoint-preserving maps X → Z. As M is a module, [X, B(M, Y)] has an obvious group structure. Inserting X = S^{n} and M = Z yields the Dold-Thom theorem for Z[X].

It is noteworthy as well that B(G, S^{1}) is a classifying space for G if G is a topological group such that the inclusion {1} → G is a cofibration.
