= Business workflow analysis =

Business workflow analysis (BWA), AKA business management systems p2p, is a management tool that streamlines, automates and improves the efficiency of business procedures.

== Overview ==
As part of the move towards the paperless office, BWA is a method allowing businesses to better comprehend their current needs and to establish future goals. The long-term objectives of BWA are those of reducing transaction costs and managing performance.

BWA generally necessitates the participation of:

- Employees whose everyday role includes the processing, handling and sharing of documents.
- Experts with a vision of how the work should be done.
- IT staff with an understanding about how the vision could be translated into a realistic solution.
- A facilitator whose role it is to manage the project and keep to specified limits in time and expenditure.

BWA in actions such as routing documents to different locations, securing approvals, scheduling and generating reports.

== See also ==
- Business Process Model and Notation
