= Self-reliance =

Self-reliance (and similar compound nouns) may refer to:

- A core element of individualism
- Self-sustainability
- Self-help
- "Self-Reliance", an essay by transcendental writer Ralph Waldo Emerson
- Self Reliance (film), a 2023 film directed by Jake Johnson
- "Self Reliance" (Dawson's Creek), a 2000 television episode
- Self Reliance (political party), in Ukraine
- Juche (lit. 'subject' or 'principal agent'), the state ideology of North Korea, typically associated with self-reliance
