= Leadership development =

Training process to develop leading abilities

Leadership development is the process which helps expand the capacity of individuals to perform in leadership roles within organizations. Leadership roles are those that facilitate execution of an organization's strategy through building alignment, winning mindshare and growing the capabilities of others. Leadership roles may be formal, with the corresponding authority to make decisions and take responsibility, or they may be informal roles with little official authority (e.g., a member of a team who influences team engagement, purpose and direction; a lateral peer who must listen and negotiate through influence).

== Developing individual leaders ==
Traditionally, leadership development has focused on developing the leadership abilities and attitudes of individuals.

Different personal traits and characteristics can help or hinder a person's leadership effectiveness and highlight the need for formalized programs to develop leadership competencies.

Classroom-style training and associated reading for leadership development may hail from the possible divergence between knowing what to do and doing what one knows; management expert Henry Mintzberg is one person to highlight this dilemma. A 2015 study published in the Proceedings of the National Academy of Sciences estimated that as little as 15% of learning from traditional classroom-style training results in sustained behavioral change within workplaces.

Baldwin and Ford link success of leadership development efforts to three variables:

1. Individual learner characteristics
2. Quality and nature of the leadership development program
3. Support for behavioral change from the leader's supervisor.

Military officer-training academies, such as the Royal Military Academy Sandhurst, go to great lengths to accept only candidates who show the highest potential to lead well. Personal characteristics that are associated with successful leadership development include leader motivation to learn, a high achievement drive and personality traits such as openness to experience, an internal focus of control, and self-monitoring. In order to develop individual leaders, supervisors or superiors must conduct an individual assessment.

Development is also more likely to occur when the design of the development program:

- Integrates a range of developmental experiences over a set period of time (e.g., 6–12 months). These experiences may include 360 degree feedback, experiential classroom style programs, business school style coursework, executive coaching, reflective journaling, mentoring and more.
- Involves goal-setting, following an assessment of key developmental needs and then an evaluation of the achievement of goals after a given time period.

Among key concepts in leadership development one may find:

- Experiential learning: Positioning the individual in the focus of the learning process, going through the four stages of experiential learning as formulated by David A. Kolb:
  1. Concrete experience.
  2. Observation and reflection.
  3. Forming abstract concepts.
  4. Testing in new situations.
- Self efficacy: The right training and coaching should bring about 'self efficacy' in the trainee, as Albert Bandura formulated: a person's belief about his capabilities to produce effects.
- Visioning: Developing the ability to formulate a clear image of the aspired future of an organization unit.
- Attitude: Attitude plays a major role in being a leader.

== Developing leadership at a collective level ==
Leadership can also be developed by strengthening the connection between, and alignment of, the efforts of individual leaders and the systems through which they influence organizational operations. This has led to a differentiation between leader development and leadership development.

Leadership development can build on the development of individuals (including followers) to become leaders. It also needs to focus on the interpersonal linkages within the team.

Following the credo of people as an organization's most valuable resource, some organizations address the development of these resources (including leadership).

In contrast, the concept of "employeeship" recognizes that what it takes to be a good leader is not too dissimilar from what it takes to be a good employee. Therefore, bringing the notional leader together with the team to explore these similarities (rather than focusing on the differences) brings positive results. This approach has been particularly successful in Sweden, where the power distance between managers and teams is small.

== Succession planning ==
The development of ‘high potentials’ to take over leadership roles when current leaders leave their positions is known as succession planning. This type of leadership development usually requires the extensive transfer of an individual between departments. In many multinationals, it often requires international transfer and experience to build a future leader.

Succession planning requires a sharp focus on the organization's future and vision, in order to align leadership development with the future the organization aspires to create. Thus, successive leadership development is based not only on knowledge and history but also on a dream. For such a plan to be successful, the screening of future leadership should be based not only on "what we know and have" but also on "what we aspire to become".

Persons involved in succession planning should include current leadership members who can articulate the future vision. Three critical dimensions should be considered:

1. Skills and knowledge;
2. Role perception and degree of acceptance of leading role; and,
3. Self-efficacy.

== See also ==
- Action learning
- Organization development
- Executive education
- Business acumen
- Collaborative leadership
- Leadership studies
- Trait leadership
- YGLP
- Halogen Foundation, an international programme to develop young leaders
- Kolb's experiential learning
