= Perth leadership outcome model =

The Perth leadership outcome model is a leadership model that characterizes leaders by the financial outcome of their leadership. It was developed by E. Ted Prince over a four-year period.

== Traditional approaches ==
The traditional leadership models are based on either a personality or a behavioral/competency approach. The personality approach is rooted in the "Great Man" theories popular in the early 20th century. Research in this tradition sought to identify the personal qualities that distinguished leaders from followers or effective leaders from ineffective leaders.

The behavioral/competency approaches focus on individual managerial competencies.

== Historical development ==
The PLOM is related to two intellectual precursors. The work by the German sociologist Max Weber, linked social and economic variables.

The other precursor is psychologist David McClelland.

== References and further reading ==
- PLOM and Business Acumen
- Ted Prince, E. (February 2006). "How to make human resources more relevant to corporate financial objectives". Human Resource Management International Digest. 14 (2): 3–4. doi:10.1108/09670730610656824.
- Prince, E. Ted The Three Financial Styles of Very Successful Leaders: Strategic Approaches to Identifying the Growth Drivers of Every Company, McGraw Hill, New York, August 2005.
- Prince, E. Ted (2005). "The fiscal behavior of CEOs". MIT Sloan Management Review. 46 (3): 23–26.
- "Book Reviews: 3". Personnel Psychology. 59 (1): 233–337. March 2006. doi:10.1111/j.1744-6570.2006.00909_3.x.
- Mihaela Popa Chraif, "Review of the Three Financial Styles of Very Successful Leaders", Europe's Journal of Psychology, February 2006,
- "The 3 Financial Styles of Very Successful Leaders", Business Book Review,
- International Leadership Association Newsletter, September 2005, p. 5.
- Harvard Business School Working Knowledge, November 7, 2005
- Bass, B. M. (1990). Bass and Stogdill’s handbook of leadership (3rd ed.) New York: Free Press.
- McCelland, D. C. (1973). Testing for competence rather than for intelligence. American Psychologist, 28, 1–14 .
- McClelland, D. C. (1961) The achieving society. Princeton: Van Nostrand.
- Schacter, H., "'Financial signature' defines a leader", GlobeandMail.com, September 28, 2005
- International Leadership Association, Interview with E. Ted Prince on the Three Financial Styles of Very Successful Leaders, September 28, 2005
- Workopolis.com Business Journal, September 28, 2005
- Small, V. "What to Look for in an Effective Leader", Regent Recruitment Newsletter, vol. 6, Winter 2005
- Jacobs, M. "What is Your Financial Signature". Catalyst Magazine, July, 2005,
- Institute of Executive Development, June 23, 2005, Interview with Dr. E. Ted Prince, "The Three Financial Styles of Very Successful Leaders".
