= YGLP =

International leadership program

- Founded: 2016
- Type: International leadership program for university and high school students
- Purpose: Leadership Development
- Headquarters: London, United Kingdom
- Origins: HSL Leadership, Human Cognition & Critical Thinking project
- Region served: worldwide
- Method: YGLP Fellow Program
- Fields: Education
- Official language: English
- Parent organization: Human Science Lab
- Website: www.yglpasia.org

YGLP (Young Global Leadership Program) is an international leadership program for university and high school students.

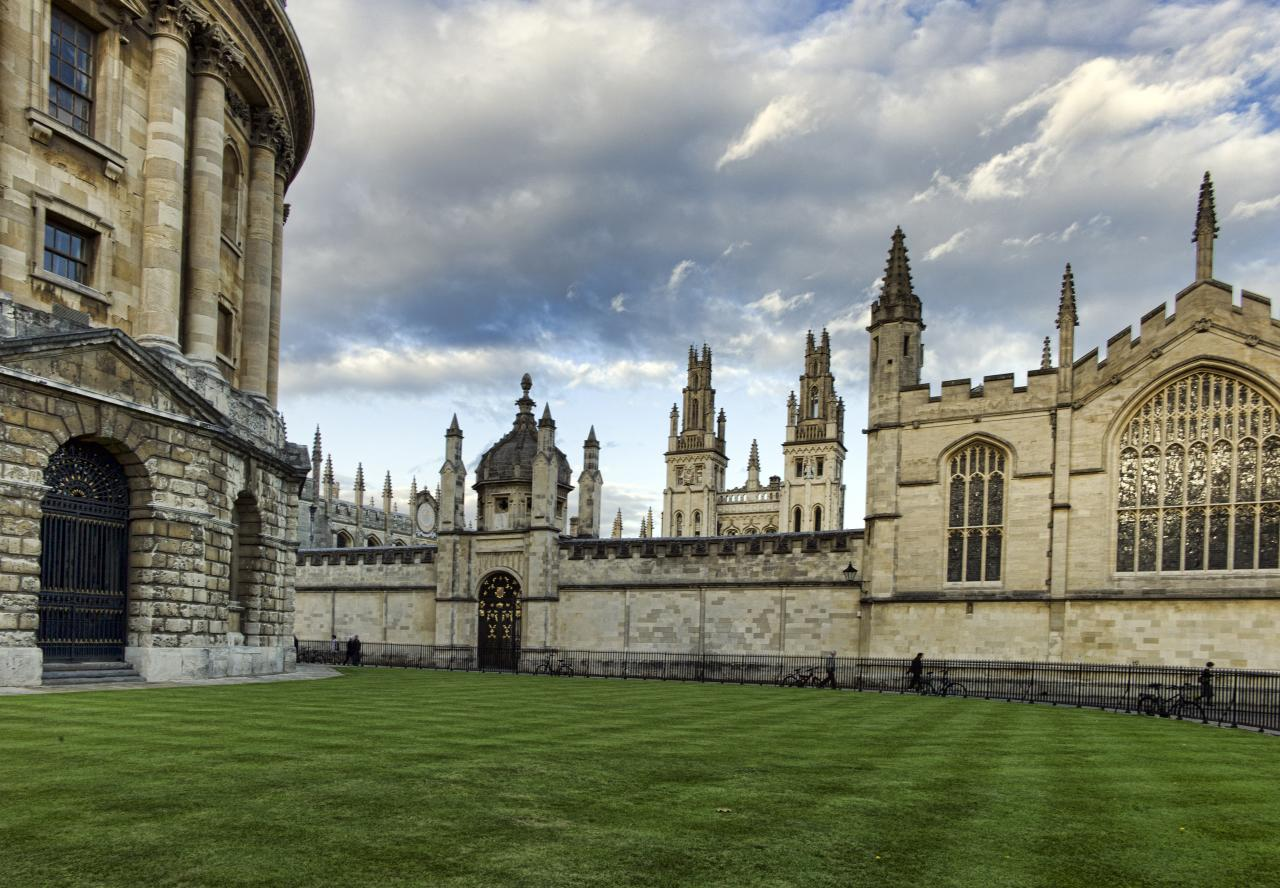
YGLP was launched in January 2016 at University of Oxford.

It is founded and developed by Human Science Lab, London, with support from several foundations and transnational organisations. It uses outcomes from some of its core research on human cognition, leadership and critical thinking.

YGLP is run in five regional groupings – Asia, Americas, Europe, Africa and the Oceania.

== Scientific Framework ==
Various research programs on human cognition, leadership, critical thinking, physical spatiality and intelligence at Human Science Lab, London, provides the scientific framework for YGLP.

YGLP is based on the Four Step Leadership Theory formulated at Human Science Lab. According to the theory “the leadership achievement of an individual is proportional to the optimal use of four principal components that makes a leader – motivation, planning, energising and executing”. YGLP is designed to optimise this four key leadership component with each program module focusing on a single component.

== YGLP Fellow Program ==
YGLP is executed through two fellow programs. The YGLP Senior fellow program is meant for university students in the age of 19 to 25 years and the Junior fellow program is for high school student in the age of 13 to 19 years. Eligible students for YGLP fellow program are selected through a leadership aptitude evaluation process.

== Program Overview ==
The YGLP fellow program is made of four core modules and one non-core module involving various instructional and resource materials, leadership workshops and leadership conferences.

== YGLP Asia ==
YGLP is run in 44 Asian countries and 2 Special Administrative Regions as YGLP Asia.
