= Corporate education =

Corporate education refers to a system of professional development activities provided to educate employees. It may consist of formal university or college training or informal training provided by non-collegiate institutions. The simplest form of corporate education may be training programs designed "in-house" for an organization that may wish to train their employees on specific aspects of their job processes or responsibilities. More formal relationships may further exist where corporate training is provided to employees through contracts or relationships with educational institutions who may award credit, either at the institution or through a system of CEUs (Continuing Education Units).

Many institutions or trainers offering corporate education will provide certificates or diplomas verifying the attendance of the employee. Some employers use corporate and continuing education as part of a holistic human resources effort to determine the performance of the employee and as part of their review systems.

Increasingly organisations appear to be using corporate education and training as an incentive to retain managers and key employees within their organisation. This win-win arrangement creates better educated managers for the organisation and provides the employees with a more marketable portfolio of skills and, in many cases, recognised qualifications.

== The difference between corporate education and corporate training ==
Most organisations tend to think of corporate education as corporate training. Corporate training programs are often competency based and related to the essential training employees need to operate certain equipment or perform certain tasks in a competent, safe and effective manner. The outcome of a corporate training program is a participant who is either able to operate a piece of equipment or perform a specific task in an effective manner according to pre-determined training criteria.

The primary role of corporate training is to ensure an employee has the knowledge and skills to undertake a specific operation to enable an organisation can continue to operate. Fundamentally, corporate training is centred on knowledge transfer, with an instructor teaching or demonstrating a particular function and the student learning and demonstrating they can apply what they have learnt to a particular operation.

Corporate education, however, adds another dimension and depth to training by involving learners as participants in generating new knowledge that assists an organisation to develop and evolve, rather than maintain the status quo. Corporate education focuses on developing the capability of an organisation to be able to do things and, in particular, the right things in order to be a sustainable and successful organisation.

Corporate education involves a facilitator, rather than an instructor or trainer, to engage participants and encourage them to think about the what, how and why of what they are doing and to challenge their current paradigms. Corporate education is centred on introducing learning techniques to stimulate employees to think about what their organisation does, where it is heading, potential new opportunities for the organisation and new and better ways of doing things. While the role of corporate training is to develop the operational competency of individuals, the purpose of corporate education is to promote the development of capability of both an individual and their organisation.

Increasingly organisations appear to be using corporate education as an incentive to retain managers and key employees within their organisation. This win-win arrangement creates better educated managers and employees for the organisation and gives individual employees a more marketable portfolio of skills and, in many cases, recognised qualifications.
