= Advances in Developing Human Resources =

- Discipline: Human resources
- Language: English
- Edited by: Marilyn Y. Byrd

Publication details
- History: 1999–present
- Publisher: SAGE Publications
- Frequency: Quarterly

Standard abbreviations
- ISO 4: Adv. Dev. Hum. Resour.

Indexing
- ISSN: 1523-4223
- LCCN: 99008212
- OCLC no.: 40662276

Links
- Journal homepage; Online access; Online archive

Advances in Developing Human Resources is a quarterly peer-reviewed academic journal that covers research on human resources, including areas such as performance, learning, and integrity within an organizational context. The editor-in-chief is Marilyn Y. Byrd (University of Oklahoma). The journal was established in 1999 and is published by SAGE Publications.

== Abstracting and indexing ==
The journal is abstracted and indexed in:

- Business Source Elite
- Business Source Premier
- PsycINFO
- Scopus
