= Reg Revans =

British long jumper and academic (1907–2003)

Personal information
- Nationality: British (English)
- Born: 14 May 1907 Portsmouth, England
- Died: 8 January 2003 (aged 95) Wem, Shropshire, England

Sport
- Sport: Athletics
- Event: long jump
- Club: University of Cambridge AC; Achilles Club
Medal record
Representing England
Men's Athletics
British Empire Games
| Silver medal – second place | 1930 Hamilton | Long jump |
| Silver medal – second place | 1930 Hamilton | Triple jump |

Reginald William Revans (14 May 1907 – 8 January 2003) was an academic professor, administrator and management consultant who pioneered the use of Action learning. He was also a long jumper who represented Britain at the 1928 Summer Olympics in Amsterdam, where he finished 32nd in the long jump event. At the first British Empire Games, in 1930, he won the silver medal in both the long jump and triple jump competition.

== Early life ==
He was born at Portsmouth, where his father was a marine surveyor. As a boy he saw his father receive a visit from seaman's representatives after the wreck of the RMS Titanic. He recollected attending the memorial service for Florence Nightingale with his mother in 1910.

In the late 1920s he was a doctoral student in astrophysics at the University of Cambridge. A Commonwealth Scholarship in 1930 took him to study astrophysics and astronomy at the University of Michigan, and on his return to Cambridge as a fellow at Emmanuel College he worked at the Cavendish Laboratory under Lord Rutherford and Sir J. J. Thomson. There were five Nobel prizewinners in the department, but Revans found them humble enough to share their puzzlements and to listen, rather than claiming to know and be able to instruct. Revans always remembered Albert Einstein saying to him: "If you think you understand a problem, make sure you are not deceiving yourself." It was here that Revans began to develop his thinking on the role of 'non-expert' in problem solving, distinguishing between knowledge and wisdom in so doing.

He moved into education to become assistant education officer for Essex (1935–1945) and then director of education for the National Coal Board from 1945 to 1950.

== Action Learning ==
It was at the Coal Board that Revans did much of the early work on developing action learning, working alongside E. F. Schumacher (author of Small is Beautiful) and Eric Trist, whose theories about socio-technical systems have also had an important influence on organisation development. He then moved to the Acton Society Trust where he worked with Teddy Chester. He and Chester both moved to the University of Manchester where Revans became the first professor of industrial management (1955–1965) but left to develop the inter-university action learning programme in Belgium.

He is recognized as one of the top management professors by the International Institute of Management for his contribution to the field of corporate training by introducing of the Action Learning formula and methods: Learning (L) = P + Q; where L is learning, P is programmed (traditional) knowledge and Q is questioning to create insight. Programmed knowledge (P) is conveyed through books, lectures, and other structured learning mechanisms.

Revans strongly held that the key to improving performance lay not with 'experts' but with practitioners themselves. Hence he devised Action Learning as a process whereby the participant studies his own actions and experience in conjunction with others in small groups called action learning sets.

== Belgium ==
After resigning from Manchester University, Revans moved to Belgium where he headed the Inter-University project, which had been set up to improve the ranking of Belgium in the organisation for Economic Co-operation and Development league. Working with five universities and 23 of the country's largest businesses, Revans' collaborative approaches succeeded in raising Belgium's industrial productivity growth rate above that of the US, Germany and Japan.

Revans was subsequently awarded with the nation's top honour by the King of Belgium.

In 1969, he was awarded an Honorary Degree (Doctor of Science) from the University of Bath.

== Later life ==
During the 1970s and 1980s he travelled round the world several times and wrote his most famous books: Developing Effective Managers (1971); The Origins and Growth of Action Learning (1982) and ABC of Action Learning (1983). From the 1980s Revans worked with public and private sector organisations, in the UK and internationally, advocating the process of action learning as a way of enabling and empowering people to learn with and from each other.

In the 1990s he was associated with the City of London where he met Raymond Mahoney and Alan Wenham-Prosser who were using his techniques to solve peoples problems of managing their work load in the city, and other personal problems which had become long term when managing difficult situations. Reg Revans was made a Freeman of the City of London for the work which he did.

Revans made furniture as a hobby, played the trumpet and painted – even illustrating small books for his children. As well as being knighted by the King of Belgium, in 1997 he was awarded the freedom of the City of London.

Revans died in Wem, Shropshire on 8 January 2003.

== Legacy ==
Revans is not remembered as one of the best known gurus of management education or organisational development, not least because of his scorn for experts and his championing of ordinary people. However, his ideas have been taught at the Revans Centre for Action Learning and Research (later the Revans Institute), part of the Salford Business School and they are applied in many organisations. His techniques have been applied in many organisations and by management consultants and academics including Richard Brimble, Mike Pedler, Alan Mumford and Richard Hale in the UK, and Michael Marquardt, Yury Boshyk, Robert Kramer and Joe Raelin in the United States.

Recently the Revans Centre has moved to Manchester Business School becoming the Revans Academy. The Revans Collection is to be found at Salford University.
