= Action learning =

Type of approach to problem solving

Action Learning is an approach to problem solving that involves taking action and reflecting upon the results. This method is purported to help improve the problem-solving process and simplify the solutions developed as a result. The theory of Action Learning and its epistemological position were originally developed by Reg Revans, who applied the method to support organizational and business development initiatives and improve on problem solving efforts.

Action Learning is effective in developing a number of individual leadership and team problem-solving skills, and has become a component in many corporate and organizational leadership development programs. The strategy is advertised as being different from the "one size fits all" curricula that are characteristic of many training and development programs.

== Overview ==
Action Learning is ideologically a cycle of "doing" and "reflecting" stages. In most forms of action learning, a coach is included and responsible for promoting and facilitating learning, as well as encouraging the team to be self-managing.

The Action Learning process includes:

1. An important and often complex problem
2. A diverse problem-solving team
3. An environment that promotes curiosity, inquiry, and reflection,
4. A requirement that talk be converted into action and, ultimately, a solution,
5. A collective commitment to learning.

== History and Development ==
The action learning approach was originated by Reg Revans. Formative influences for Revans included his time working as a physicist at the University of Cambridge, wherein he noted the importance of each scientist describing their own ignorance, sharing experiences, and communally reflecting in order to learn. Revans used these experiences to further develop the method in the 1940s while working for the United Kingdom's National Coal Board, where he encouraged managers to meet together in small groups to share their experiences and ask each other questions about what they saw and heard. From these experiences Revans felt that conventional instructional methods were largely ineffective, and that individuals needed to be aware of their lack of relevant knowledge and be prepared to explore that ignorance with suitable questions and help from other people in similar positions.

== Formula ==
Revans makes the pedagogical approach of Action Learning more precise in the opening chapter of his book which describes that "learning" is the result of combining "programmed knowledge" and "questioning", frequently abbreviated by the formula: $L = P + Q$

In this paradigm, "questioning" is intended to create insight into what people see, hear or feel, and may be divided into multiple categories of question, including open and closed questions. Although questioning is considered the cornerstone of the method, more relaxed formulations have enabled Action Learning to gain use in many countries all over the world, including the United States, Canada, Latin America, the Middle East, Africa, and Asia-Pacific.

The International Management Centres Association and Michael Marquardt have both proposed an extension to this formula with the addition of R for "reflection": $L = P + Q + R$.

This additional element emphasizes the point that "great questions" should evoke thoughtful reflections while considering the current problem, the desired goal, designing strategies, developing action or implementation plans, or executing action steps that are components of the implementation plan.

== Questioning in Action Learning ==
Action Learning purports that one of the keys to effective problem solving is asking the 'right question'. When asked to the right people at the right time, these questions help obtaining the necessary information. The Action Learning process, which primarily uses a questioning approach, can be more helpful than offering advice because it assumes that each person has the capacity to find their own answers. A 2026 exploratory case study described "silent action learning" as a pattern in a hierarchical, high power-distance organisation in which questioning continues laterally between peers while direct upward questioning is constrained.

Action-based learning questions are questions that are based on the approach of action learning where one solves real-life problems that involve taking action and reflecting upon the results. As opposed to asking a question to gain information, in Action Learning the purpose of questioning is to help someone else explore new options and perspectives, and reflect in order to make better decisions.

=== Types of questions ===
==== Closed questions ====
Closed questions do not allow the respondents to develop their response, generally by limiting respondents with a limited set of possible answers. Answers to closed questions are often monosyllabic words or short phrases, including "yes" and "no".

While closed questions typically have simple answers, they should not be interpreted as simple questions. Closed questions can range widely in complexity, and may force the respondent to think significantly before answering. The purposes of closed questions include obtaining facts, initiating the conversation, and maintaining conversational control for the questioner.

Examples of closed questions:

- "What is your name?"
- "What color is the sky today?"
- "When two quantities are dependent on each other, does an increase in one always leads to an increase in the other?"

==== Open questions ====
Open questions allow the respondent to expand or explore in their response, and do not have a single correct response. In the framework of Action Learning, this gives the respondent the freedom to discover new ideas, consider different possibilities, and decide on the course of action which is right for them.

Open-ended questions are not always long, and shorter questions often have equal or greater impact than longer ones. When using the Action Learning approach, it is important to be aware of one's tone and language. The goal is usually to ask challenging questions, or to challenge the respondent's perspective. The purposes of open questions include encouraging discussion and reflection, expanding upon a closed question, and giving control of the conversation to the respondent.

Examples of open questions:

- "Why do you think that might have happened?"
- "How did that make you feel?"
- "What problems do you think this strategy could cause?"

== Use in organizations ==
It is applied by using the Action Learning question method to support organizational development. Action Learning is practiced by a wide community of businesses, governments, non-profits, and educational institutions. Organizations may also use Action Learning in the virtual environment. This is a cost-effective solution that enables the widespread use of Action Learning at all levels of an organization. Action e-Learning provides a viable alternative for organizations interested in adapting the action learning process for online delivery with groups where the members are not co-located.

Robert Kramer pioneered the use of Action Learning for officials in the United States government, and at the European Commission in Brussels and Luxembourg. He also introduced Action Learning to scientists at the European Environment Agency in Copenhagen, to officials of the Estonian government at the State Chancellery in Tallinn, Estonia, and to students of communication and media studies at Corvinus University of Budapest.

== Models of Action Learning ==
The influence of Revans's Action Learning Formula can be seen today in many leadership and organization development initiatives in corporate training and executive education institutes. Since the 1940s, several developments to Revans' original training model have been created. As with other pedagogical approaches, practitioners have built on Revans' original work and adapted tenets to accommodate their specific needs.

=== Action Reflection Learning and the MiL model ===
One such branch of Action Learning is Action Reflection Learning (ARL), which originated in Sweden among educators and consultants under the guidance of Lennart Rohlin of the MiL Institute in the 1970s. Using the "MiL model," ARL gained momentum in the field of Leadership in International Management.

The main differences between Revans' approach to action learning and the 'MiL Model' in the 1980s are:

1. The role of a project team advisor (later called Learning Coach),
2. The use of "team projects" rather than individual challenges,
3. The duration of the sessions, which is more flexible in ARL designs.

The MiL model and ARL evolved as practitioners responded to diverse needs and restrictions—MiL practitioners varied the number and duration of the sessions, the type of project selected, the role of the Learning Coach and the style of their interventions. In 2004, Isabel Rimanoczy researched and codified the ARL methodology, identifying 16 elements and 10 underlying principles.

=== The World Institute for Action Learning model ===
The World Institute for Action Learning (WIAL) model was developed by Michael Marquardt, Skipton Leonard, Bea Carson and Arthur Freedman. The model starts with two simple "ground rules" that ensure that statements are related to questions, and grant authority to the coach in order to promote learning. Team members may develop additional ground rules, norms, and roles as they deem necessary or advantageous. Addressing Revans' concern that a coach's over-involvement in the problem-solving process will engender dependency, WIAL coaches only ask questions that encourage team members to reflect on the team's behavior (what is working, can be improved, or done differently) in efforts to improve learning and, ultimately, performance.

=== Executive Action Learning (EAL) Model ===
The action learning model has evolved from an organizational development tool led by learning and development (L&D) managers to organizational alignment and performance tool led by executives, where CEOs and their executive teams facilitate action-learning sessions to align the organizational objectives at various organizational levels and departments. One such example is the Executive Action-Learning (EAL) Model which originated in the United States in 2005.

The EAL model differs from the traditional organizational training methods by shifting the focus from professor-led, general knowledge memorization and presentations to executive-led and project-based experiential reflection and problem-solving as the major learning tool.

== "Unlearning" as a prerequisite for "learning" ==
The process of learning more creative ways of thinking, feeling, and being is achieved in Action Learning by reflecting on what is working now and on actions that can be improved. Action Learning is consistent with the principles of positive psychology and appreciative inquiry by encouraging team members to build on strengths and learn from challenges. In Action Learning, reflecting on what has and has not worked helps team members unlearn what doesn't work and develop new and improved ways to increase productivity moving forward.

Robert Kramer applies the theory of art, creativity and "unlearning" of the psychologist Otto Rank to his practice of Action Learning. In Kramer's work, Action Learning questions allow group members to "step out of the frame of the prevailing ideology," reflect on their assumptions and beliefs, and re-frame their choices. Through the lens of Otto Rank's work on understanding art and artists, Action Learning can be seen as the never-completed process of learning how to "step out of the frame" of the ruling mindset, and learning how to unlearn.

== Role of Facilitator in Action Learning ==
An ongoing challenge of Action Learning has been to take productive action as well as to take the time necessary to capture the learning that result from reflecting on the results of taking action. Usually, the urgency of the problem or task decreases or eliminates the reflective time necessary for learning. As a consequence, more and more organizations have recognized the critical importance of an Action Learning coach or facilitator in the process, someone who has the authority and responsibility of creating time and space for the group to learn at the individual, group and organizational level.

There is controversy, however, about the need for an Action Learning coach. Revans was skeptical about the use of learning coaches and, in general, of interventionist approaches. He believed the Action Learning set Action Learning on its own. He also had a major concern that too much process facilitation would lead a group to become dependent on a coach or facilitator. Nevertheless, later in his development of the Action Learning method, Revans experimented with including a role that he described as a "supernumerary" that had many similarities to that of a facilitator or coach. Pedler distills Revans' thinking about the key role of the action learning facilitator as follows:

(i) The initiator or "accoucheur": "No organisation is likely to embrace action learning unless there is some person within it ready to fight on its behalf. ...This useful intermediary we may call the accoucheur—the managerial midwife who sees that their organisation gives birth to a new idea...".

(ii) The set facilitator or "combiner": "there may be a need when it (the set) is first formed for some supernumerary brought into speed the integration of the set ...." but "Such a combiner ...must contrive that it (the set) achieves independence of them at the earliest possible moment...".

(iii) The facilitator of organizational learning or the "learning community" organiser:

"The most precious asset of any organization is the one most readily overlooked: its capacity to build upon its lived experience, to learn from its challenges and to turn in a better performance by inviting all and sundry to work out for themselves what that performance ought to be."

Hale suggested that the facilitator role developed by Revans be incorporated into any standards for Action Learning facilitation accreditation. Hale also suggests the Action Learning facilitator role includes the functions of mobilizer, learning set adviser, and learning catalyst. To increase the reflective, learning aspect of Action Learning, many groups now adopt the practice or norm of focusing on questions rather than statements while working on the problem and developing strategies and actions.

Self-managed action learning is a variant of Action Learning that dispenses with the need for a facilitator of the action learning set, including in virtual and hybrid settings. There are a number of problems, however, with purely self-managed teams (i.e., with no coach). It has been noted that self-managing teams (such as task forces) seldom take the time to reflect on what they are doing or make efforts to identify key lessons learned from the process. Without reflection, team members are likely to import organizational or sub-unit cultural norms and familiar problem solving practices into the problem-solving process without explicitly testing their validity and utility. Team members employ assumptions, mental models, and beliefs about methods or processes that are seldom openly challenged, much less tested. As a result, teams often apply traditional problem solving methods to non-traditional, urgent, critical, and discontinuous problems. In addition, team members often "leap" from the initial problem statement to some form of brainstorming that they assume will produce a viable solution. These suggested solutions typically provoke objections, doubts, concerns, or reservations from other team members who advocate their own preferred solutions. The conflicts that ensue are generally both unproductive and time-consuming. As a result, self-managed teams, tend to split or fragment rather than develop into a cohesive, high-performing team.

Because of these typical characteristics of self-managing teams, many theorists and practitioners have argued that real and effective self-management in action learning requires coaches with the authority to intervene whenever they perceive an opportunity to promote learning or improve team performance. Without this facilitator role, there is no assurance that the team will make the time needed for the periodic, systemic, and strategic inquiry and reflection that is necessary for effective individual, team, and organizational learning.

== Organizations and Community ==
A number of organizations sponsor events focusing on the implementation and improvement of Action Learning, including The Journal of Action Learning: Research & Practice, the World Institute of Action Learning Global Forum, the Global Forum on Executive Development and Business Driven Action Learning, and the Action Learning, Action Research Association World Congress. There are also LinkedIn interest groups devoted to Action Learning include WIAL Network, Action Learning Forum, International Foundation for Action Learning, Global Forum on Business Driven Action Learning and Executive Development, Learning Thru Action, and Action Research and Learning in Organizations.

== See also ==
- Action research
- Action teaching
- Chris Argyris § Action science
- Experiential learning
- Inquiry-based learning
- Large-group capacitation
- Learning cycle
