= Ganea =

Ganea may refer to:

== People ==
- Cristian Ganea (born 1992), Romanian football striker
- Ionel Ganea (born 1973), Romanian football striker
- Liviu Ganea (born 1988), Romanian football striker
- Tudor Ganea (1922–1971), Romanian mathematician

== Other people ==
- Eilenberg–Ganea conjecture, a claim in algebraic topology
- Ganea conjecture, a claim in algebraic topology, now disproved
