= Eilenberg–Ganea theorem =

On constructing an aspherical CW complex whose fundamental group is a given group

In mathematics, particularly in homological algebra and algebraic topology, the Eilenberg–Ganea theorem states for every finitely generated group G with certain conditions on its cohomological dimension (namely $3\le \operatorname{cd}(G)\le n$), one can construct an aspherical CW complex X of dimension n whose fundamental group is G. The theorem is named after Polish mathematician Samuel Eilenberg and Romanian mathematician Tudor Ganea. The theorem was first published in a short paper in 1957 in the Annals of Mathematics.

== Definitions ==
Group cohomology: Let $G$ be a group and let $X=K(G,1)$ be the corresponding Eilenberg−MacLane space. Then we have the following singular chain complex which is a free resolution of $\mathbb{Z}$ over the group ring $\mathbb{Z}[G]$ (where $\mathbb{Z}$ is a trivial $\mathbb{Z}[G]$-module):

$$\cdots \xrightarrow{\delta_n+1} C_n(E)\xrightarrow{\delta_n} C_{n-1}(E)\rightarrow \cdots \rightarrow C_1(E)\xrightarrow{\delta_1} C_0(E)\xrightarrow{\varepsilon} \Z\rightarrow 0,$$

where $E$ is the universal cover of $X$ and $C_k(E)$ is the free abelian group generated by the singular $k$-chains on $E$. The group cohomology of the group $G$ with coefficient in a $\Z[G]$-module $M$ is the cohomology of this chain complex with coefficients in $M$, and is denoted by $H^*(G,M)$.

Cohomological dimension: A group $G$ has cohomological dimension $n$ with coefficients in $\Z$ (denoted by $\operatorname{cd}_{\Z}(G)$) if

$$n=\sup \{k : \text{There exists a }\Z[G]\text{ module }M\text{ with }H^{k}(G,M)\neq 0\}.$$

Fact: If $G$ has a projective resolution of length at most $n$, i.e., $\Z$ as trivial $\Z[G]$ module has a projective resolution of length at most $n$ if and only if $H^i_{\Z}(G,M)=0$ for all $\Z$-modules $M$ and for all $i>n$.

Therefore, we have an alternative definition of cohomological dimension as follows,

The cohomological dimension of G with coefficient in $\Z$ is the smallest n (possibly infinity) such that G has a projective resolution of length n, i.e., $\Z$ has a projective resolution of length n as a trivial $\Z[G]$ module.

== Eilenberg−Ganea theorem ==
Let $G$ be a finitely presented group and $n\ge 3$ be an integer. Suppose the cohomological dimension of $G$ with coefficients in $\Z$ is at most $n$, i.e., $\operatorname{cd}_{\Z}(G)\le n$. Then there exists an $n$-dimensional aspherical CW complex $X$ such that the fundamental group of $X$ is $G$, i.e., $\pi_1(X)=G$.

== Converse ==
Converse of this theorem is a consequence of cellular homology, and the fact that every free module is projective.

Theorem: Let X be an aspherical n-dimensional CW complex with π_{1}(X) = G, then cd_{Z}(G) ≤ n.

== Related results and conjectures ==
For n = 1 the result is one of the consequences of Stallings theorem about ends of groups.

Theorem: Every finitely generated group of cohomological dimension one is free.

For $n=2$ the statement is known as the Eilenberg–Ganea conjecture.

Eilenberg−Ganea Conjecture: If a group G has cohomological dimension 2 then there is a 2-dimensional aspherical CW complex X with $\pi_1(X)=G$.

It is known that given a group G with $\operatorname{cd}_{\Z}(G)=2$, there exists a 3-dimensional aspherical CW complex X with $\pi_1(X)=G$.

== See also ==
- Eilenberg–Ganea conjecture
- Group cohomology
- Cohomological dimension
- Stallings theorem about ends of groups
