= Gauss map =

Differential geometry topic

The Gauss map provides a mapping from every point on a curve or a surface to a corresponding point on a unit sphere. In this example, the curvature of a 2D-surface is mapped onto a 1D unit circle.

In differential geometry, the Gauss map of a surface is a function that maps each point in the surface to its normal direction, a unit vector that is orthogonal to the surface at that point. Namely, given a surface X in Euclidean space R^{3}, the Gauss map is a map N: X → S^{2} (where S^{2} is the unit sphere) such that for each p in X, the function value N(p) is a unit vector orthogonal to X at p. The Gauss map is named after Carl F. Gauss.

The Gauss map can be defined (globally) if and only if the surface is orientable, in which case its degree is half the Euler characteristic. The Gauss map can always be defined locally (i.e. on a small piece of the surface). The Jacobian determinant of the Gauss map is equal to Gaussian curvature, and the differential of the Gauss map is called the shape operator.

Gauss first wrote a draft on the topic in 1825 and published in 1827.

There is also a Gauss map for a link, which computes linking number.

== Generalizations ==
The Gauss map can be defined for hypersurfaces in R^{n} as a map from a hypersurface to the unit sphere S^{n − 1} ⊆ R^{n}.

For a general oriented k-submanifold of R^{n} the Gauss map can also be defined, and its target space is the oriented Grassmannian $\tilde{G}_{k,n}$, i.e. the set of all oriented k-planes in R^{n}. In this case a point on the submanifold is mapped to its oriented tangent subspace. One can also map to its oriented normal subspace; these are equivalent as $\tilde{G}_{k,n} \cong \tilde{G}_{n-k,n}$ via orthogonal complement. In Euclidean 3-space, this says that an oriented 2-plane is characterized by an oriented 1-line, equivalently a unit normal vector (as $\tilde{G}_{1,n} \cong S^{n-1}$), hence this is consistent with the definition above.

Finally, the notion of Gauss map can be generalized to an oriented submanifold X of dimension k in an oriented ambient Riemannian manifold M of dimension n. In that case, the Gauss map then goes from X to the set of tangent k-planes in the tangent bundle TM. The target space for the Gauss map N is a Grassmann bundle built on the tangent bundle TM. In the case where $M=\mathbf{R}^n$, the tangent bundle is trivialized (so the Grassmann bundle becomes a map to the Grassmannian), and we recover the previous definition.

== Total curvature ==
The area of the image of the Gauss map is called the total curvature and is equivalent to the surface integral of the Gaussian curvature within regions where the sign of the curvature does not change. This is the original interpretation given by Gauss.

$\iint_R \pm|N_u \times N_v| \ du\, dv = \iint_R K|X_u \times X_v| \ du\, dv = \iint_S K \ dA$

The Gauss–Bonnet theorem links total curvature of a surface to its topological properties.

== Cusps of the Gauss map ==
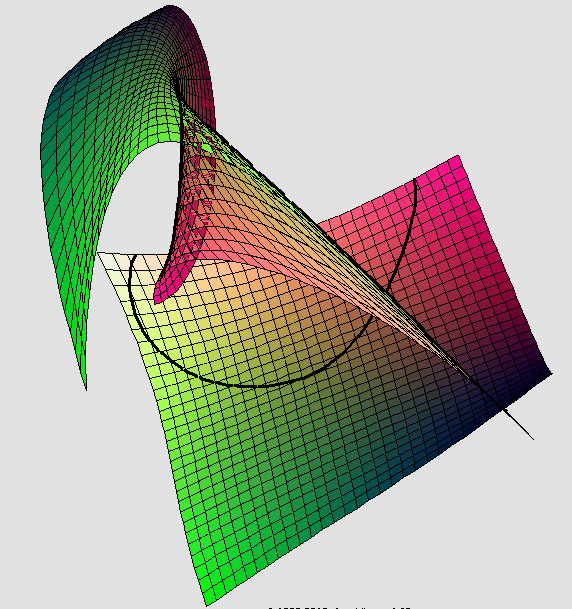
A surface with a parabolic line and its Gauss map. A ridge passes through the parabolic line giving rise to a cusp on the Gauss map.

The Gauss map reflects many properties of the surface: when the surface has zero Gaussian curvature (that is along a parabolic line), the Gauss map will have a fold catastrophe. This fold may contain cusps and these cusps were studied in depth by Thomas Banchoff, Terence Gaffney and Clint McCrory. Both parabolic lines and cusp are stable phenomena and will remain under slight deformations of the surface. Cusps occur when:

1. The surface has a bi-tangent plane;
2. A ridge crosses a parabolic line;
3. At the closure of the set of inflection points of the asymptotic curves of the surface.

There are two types of cusp: elliptic cusp and hyperbolic cusp.
