= OXM =

OXM may refer to

- Official Xbox Magazine, a magazine published in the UK and US
- Object X-Machine, a variant of the X-machine
- Object XML Mapping, a software technique
- Ogg Extended Module, a lossy compressed file format for music
- Oxyntomodulin, a peptide hormone
