= Aspherical =

Aspherical may refer to:

- Aspherical space, a concept in topology
- Aspherical lens, a type of lens assembly used in photography which contains an aspheric lens, sometimes referred to as ASPH
