= Communicating X-machine =

Model of computation

The communicating (stream) X-machine is a model of computation introduced by various researchers in the 1990s to model systems composed of communicating agents. The model exists in several variants, which are either based directly on Samuel Eilenberg's X-machine or on Gilbert Laycock's later Stream X-Machine.
