= Mayer-Vietoris =

Mayer-Vietoris may refer to:

- Mayer–Vietoris axiom
- Mayer–Vietoris sequence
