= Categories for the Working Mathematician =

Book by Saunders Mac Lane

- Author: Saunders Mac Lane
- Language: English
- Series: Graduate Texts in Mathematics; Vol. 5
- Subject: Category theory
- Publisher: Springer
- Publication date: 1971
- Publication place: United States
- Media type: Print
- Pages: 262
- ISBN: 0-387-90036-5
- OCLC: 488352436
- Dewey Decimal: 512.55
- LC Class: LCC QA169.M33

Categories for the Working Mathematician is a textbook in category theory written by American mathematician Saunders Mac Lane, who founded the subject together with Samuel Eilenberg. It was first published in 1971, and is based on his lectures given at the University of Chicago, the Australian National University, Bowdoin College, and Tulane University. It is widely regarded as the premier introduction to the subject.

== Contents ==
The book has twelve chapters, which are:

Chapter I. Categories, Functors, and Natural Transformations.
Chapter II. Constructions on Categories.
Chapter III. Universals and Limits.
Chapter IV. Adjoints.
Chapter V. Limits.
Chapter VI. Monads and Algebras.
Chapter VII. Monoids.
Chapter VIII. Abelian Categories.
Chapter IX. Special Limits.
Chapter X. Kan Extensions.
Chapter XI. Symmetry and Braiding in Monoidal Categories
Chapter XII. Structures in Categories.

Chapters XI and XII were added in the 1998 second edition, the first in view of its importance in string theory and quantum field theory, and the second to address higher-dimensional categories that have come into prominence.

Although it is the classic reference for category theory, some of the terminology is not standard. In particular, Mac Lane attempted to settle an ambiguity in usage for the terms epimorphism and monomorphism by introducing the terms epic and monic, but the distinction is not in common use.
