= Joseph Neisendorfer =

Joseph Alvin Neisendorfer
- Born: April 22, 1945 (age 81); Chicago, Illinois, U.S.
- Education: University of Chicago (BS); Princeton University (MA, PhD)
- Known for: Rational homotopy theory Unstable homotopy theory
- Scientific career
- Fields: Mathematics
- Workplaces: University of Notre Dame; Syracuse University; Fordham University; Institute for Advanced Study; Ohio State University; University of Rochester
- Doctoral advisor: John Coleman Moore

Joseph Alvin Neisendorfer (born April 22, 1945, in Chicago) is an American mathematician known for his work in homotopy theory, an area of algebraic topology. He is a Fellow of the American Mathematical Society.

== Education and career ==
Neisendorfer earned his bachelor's degree in 1967 from the University of Chicago. He earned his master's degree in 1968 and his doctorate in 1972 from Princeton University, working under the direction of John Coleman Moore.

In 1972, he began working as an assistant professor at the University of Notre Dame, then in 1976 at Syracuse University, and then in 1978 at Fordham University. From September 1979 to July 1983, he worked at the Institute for Advanced Study after which he became an associate professor at Ohio State University. He is now an emeritus professor at the University of Rochester where he worked for 26 years from 1985 until his retirement in 2011, serving as department chair from 1994 to 1996.

During his tenure as the department chair, the University of Rochester experienced severe financial challenges which led to significant restructuring entitled the Rochester Renaissance Plan. In November 1995, the mathematics department was told by the University of Rochester administration that the doctoral program was slated for removal and that the departmental faculty slated for significant downsizing, and admissions to the University of Rochester doctoral program in Mathematics were suspended. This decision led to the involvement of the American Mathematical Society, which passed a resolution urging Rochester to reconsider and formed a task force (chaired by Arthur Jaffe) to address the issue. After a fact-finding committee organized by Neisendorfer sent its report to the university administration, the doctoral program in mathematics was restored.

== Mathematics ==
Neisendorfer is best known for a series of influential papers on unstable homotopy groups of spheres with John Moore and Frederick R. Cohen.

Neisendorfer's book Algebraic Methods in Unstable Homotopy Theory was described by Stephen Theriault in the Bulletin of the London Mathematical Society as "very well written and organized". Theriault recommended it as a text for students preparing to conduct research in unstable homotopy theory and as a reference for experts.

== Selected Publications ==
- Cohen, Frederick R.; Moore, John C.; Neisendorfer, Joseph A. (1979). "Torsion in homotopy groups". Annals of Mathematics. (2). 109 (1): 121–168. doi:10.2307/1971269. JSTOR 1971269. MR 0519355.
- Cohen, Frederick R.; Moore, John C.; Neisendorfer, Joseph A. (1979). "The double suspension and exponents of the homotopy groups of spheres". Annals of Mathematics. (2). 110 (3): 549–565. doi:10.2307/1971238. JSTOR 1971238. MR 0519355.
- Neisendorfer, Joseph (3 May 2010). Algebraic Methods in Unstable Homotopy Theory. Cambridge University Press. doi:10.1017/CBO9780511691638. ISBN 9780511691638.
