= Sophomore =

Student in the second year of schooling in some countries

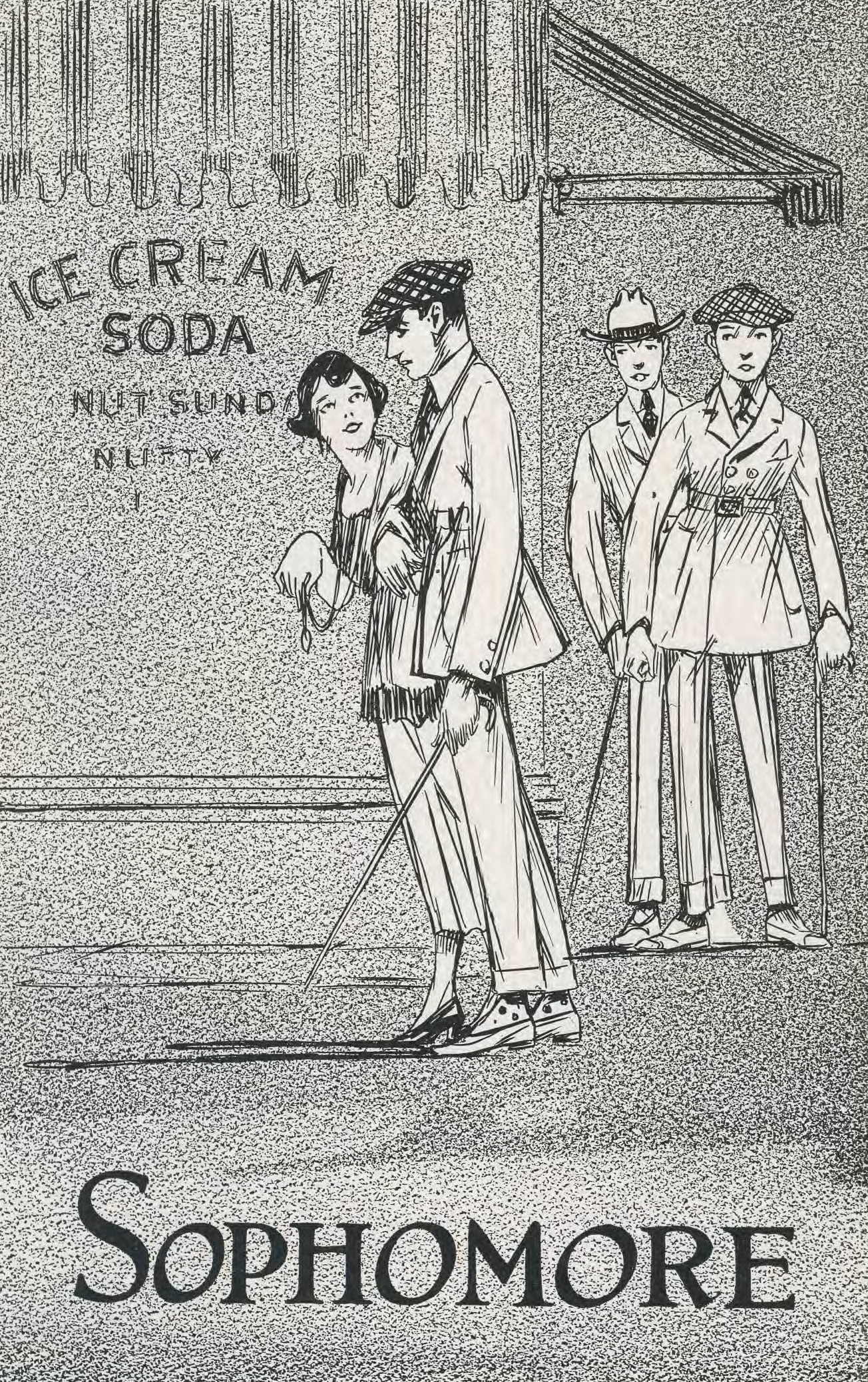
Sophomore class artwork, from East Texas State Normal College's 1920 Locust yearbook

In the United States, a sophomore (/ˈsɑːf.mɔːr/ or /ˈsɒ.fə.mɔːr/) is a person in the second year at an educational institution; usually at a secondary school or at the college and university level, but also in other forms of post-secondary educational institutions or even primary schools. In high school, a sophomore is equivalent to a tenth grade or Class-10 student.

In sports, sophomore may also refer to a professional athlete in their second season. In entertainment, television series in their second season may be referred to as sophomore shows, while actors and musicians experiencing their second major success may be referred to as sophomore artists.

== High school ==
The 10th grade is the second year of a student's high school period (usually aged 15–16) in the United States and is referred to as sophomore year, so in a four-year course the stages are freshman, sophomore, junior and senior.

In How to Read a Book, the Aristotelian philosopher and founder of the "Great Books of the Western World" program Mortimer Adler says, "There have always been literate ignoramuses, who have read too widely, and not well. The Greeks had a name for such a mixture of learning and folly which might be applied to the bookish but poorly read of all ages. They are all 'sophomores'." This oxymoron points at the Greek words σοφός (sofos, 'wise') and μωρός (moros, 'fool').

High-school sophomores are expected to begin preparing for the college application process, including increasing and focusing their extracurricular activities. Students at this level are also considered to be developing greater ability for abstract thinking.

The 1911 Sophomore class of Riverside Military Academy in Macon, Georgia

== Tertiary education ==
The term sophomore is also used to refer to a student in the second year of college or university studies in the United States; typically a college sophomore is 19 to 20 years old. Sophomores generally work on completing general education requirements and might declare their major if they are allowed. College sophomores are also advised to begin thinking of career options and to get involved in volunteering or social organizations on or near campus.

== See also ==
- Sophomore slump
- Second-system effect
- Sophomore's dream
- Freshman
- Junior (education year)
- Senior (education)
