= Cohomological dimension =

Concept in abstract algebra

In abstract algebra, cohomological dimension is an invariant of a group which measures the homological complexity of its representations. It has important applications in geometric group theory, topology, and algebraic number theory.

== Cohomological dimension of a group ==
As most cohomological invariants, the cohomological dimension involves a choice of a "ring of coefficients" R, with a prominent special case given by $R=\Z$, the ring of integers. Let G be a discrete group, R a non-zero ring with a unit, and $RG$ the group ring. The group G has cohomological dimension less than or equal to n, denoted $\operatorname{cd}_R(G)\le n$, if the trivial $RG$-module R has a projective resolution of length n, i.e. there are projective $RG$-modules $P_0,\dots , P_n$ and $RG$-module homomorphisms $d_k\colon P_k\to P_{k-1} (k = 1,\dots, n)$ and $d_0\colon P_0\to R$, such that the image of $d_k$ coincides with the kernel of $d_{k-1}$ for $k = 1, \dots, n$ and the kernel of $d_n$ is trivial.

Equivalently, the cohomological dimension is less than or equal to n if for an arbitrary $RG$-module M, the cohomology of G with coefficients in M vanishes in degrees $k>n$, that is, $H^k(G,M) = 0$ whenever $k>n$. The p-cohomological dimension for prime p is similarly defined in terms of the p-torsion groups $H^k(G,M){p}$.

The smallest n such that the cohomological dimension of G is less than or equal to n is the cohomological dimension of G (with coefficients R), which is denoted $n=\operatorname{cd}_{R}(G)$.

A free resolution of $\Z$ can be obtained from a free action of the group G on a contractible topological space X. In particular, if X is a contractible CW complex of dimension n with a free action of a discrete group G that permutes the cells, then $\operatorname{cd}_{\Z}(G)\le n$.

== Examples ==
In the first group of examples, let the ring R of coefficients be $\Z$.

- A free group has cohomological dimension one. As shown by John Stallings (for finitely generated group) and Richard Swan (in full generality), this property characterizes free groups. This result is known as the Stallings–Swan theorem. The Stallings-Swan theorem for a group G says that G is free if and only if every extension by G with abelian kernel is split.
- The fundamental group of a compact, connected, orientable Riemann surface other than the sphere has cohomological dimension two.
- More generally, the fundamental group of a closed, connected, orientable aspherical manifold of dimension n has cohomological dimension n. In particular, the fundamental group of a closed orientable hyperbolic n-manifold has cohomological dimension n.
- Nontrivial finite groups have infinite cohomological dimension over $\Z$. More generally, the same is true for groups with nontrivial torsion.

Now consider the case of a general ring R.

- A group G has cohomological dimension 0 if and only if its group ring $RG$ is semisimple. Thus a finite group has cohomological dimension 0 if and only if its order (or, equivalently, the orders of its elements) is invertible in R.
- Generalizing the Stallings–Swan theorem for $R=\Z$, Martin Dunwoody proved that a group has cohomological dimension at most one over an arbitrary ring R if and only if it is the fundamental group of a connected graph of finite groups whose orders are invertible in R.

== Cohomological dimension of a field ==
The p-cohomological dimension of a field K is the p-cohomological dimension of the Galois group of a separable closure of K. The cohomological dimension of K is the supremum of the p-cohomological dimension over all primes p.

== Examples ==
- Every field of non-zero characteristic p has p-cohomological dimension at most 1.
- Every finite field has absolute Galois group isomorphic to $\hat{\Z}$ and so has cohomological dimension 1.
- The field of formal Laurent series $k((t))$ over an algebraically closed field k of characteristic zero also has absolute Galois group isomorphic to $\hat{\Z}$ and so cohomological dimension 1.

== See also ==
- Eilenberg−Ganea conjecture
- Group cohomology
- Global dimension
