= Parabolic line =

In differential geometry, a smooth surface in three dimensions has a parabolic point when the Gaussian curvature is zero. Typically such points lie on a curve called the parabolic line which separates the surface into regions of positive and negative Gaussian curvature.

Points on the parabolic line give rise to folds on the Gauss map: where a ridge crosses a parabolic line there is a cusp of the Gauss map.
