= Frederick R. Cohen =

American mathematician (1945–2022)

Fred Cohen
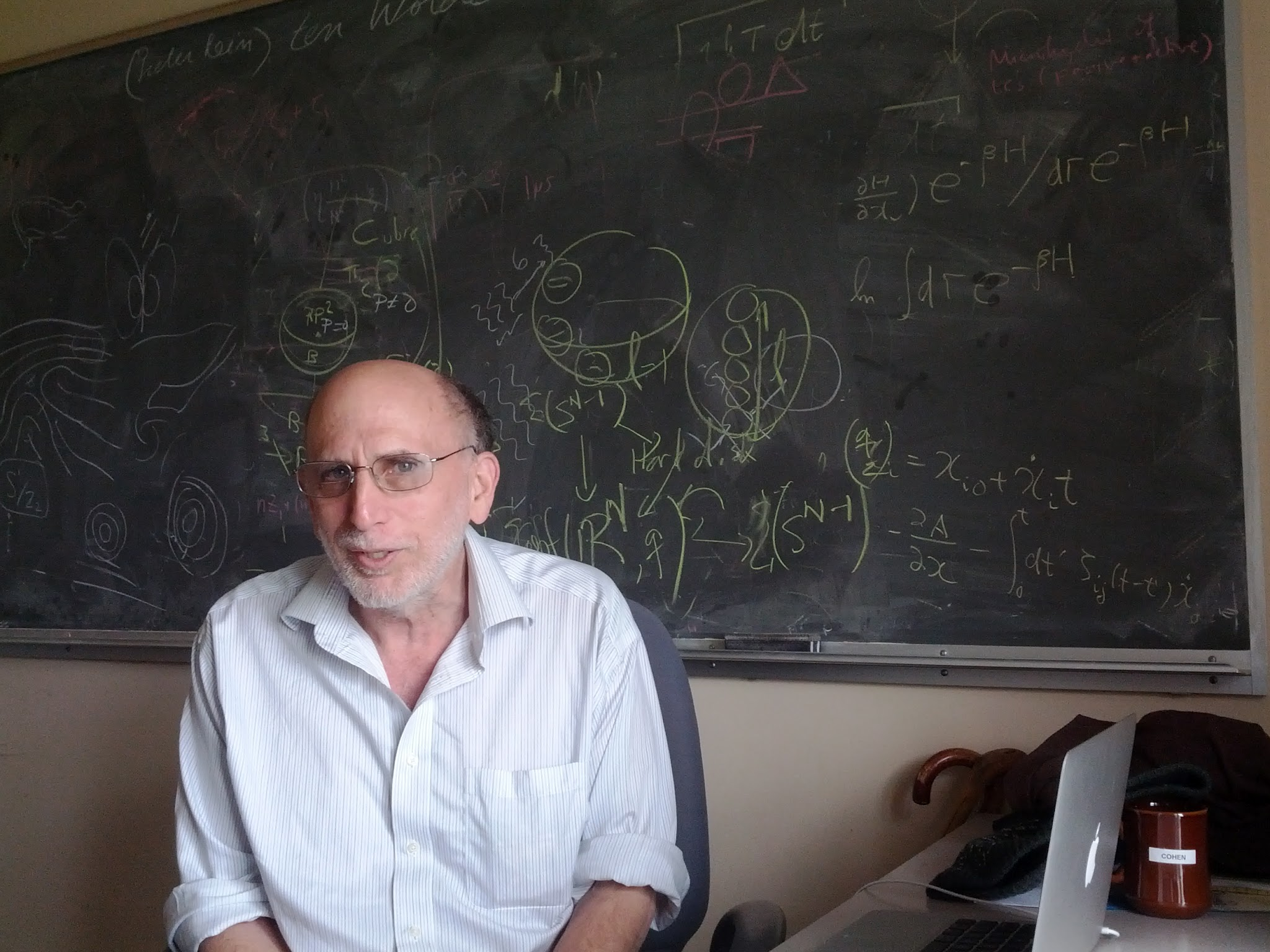
- Fred Cohen at the Kavli Institute in Santa Barbara in Summer 2012.
- Born: 1945; Chicago
- Died: January 16, 2022 (aged 76–77)
- Education: University of Chicago
- Known for: topology of configuration spaces calculation of homotopy groups of spheres polyhedral products
- Awards: Sloan Research Fellow; Fellow of the AMS
- Scientific career
- Fields: Mathematics
- Workplaces: University of Rochester
- Thesis: The Cohomology of Braid Spaces (1972)
- Doctoral advisor: J. Peter May
- Website: Academic website (archived)

Frederick Ronald Cohen (1945 – January 16, 2022) was an American mathematician working in algebraic topology.

== Education and career ==
Fred Cohen was born in 1945 in Chicago. He received a BA from Brandeis University in 1967 and a PhD from the University of Chicago in 1972. He taught at the University of Northern Illinois until 1979 and then at the University of Kentucky. In 1989, he settled at the University of Rochester, where he spent the rest of his career.

== Mathematics ==
Cohen did influential work in several areas of homotopy theory. His thesis concerned the topology of configuration spaces, a topic he came back to throughout his life, with connections to braid groups and mapping class groups. This was followed by a series of influential papers on unstable homotopy groups of spheres with John Moore and Joseph Neisendorfer. Late in his life, Cohen studied polyhedral products in a series of articles with Bahri, Bendersky, and Gitler.

=== Selected publications ===
- Cohen, Frederick R.; Lada, Thomas J.; May, J. Peter (1976). The Homology of Iterated Loop Spaces. Lecture Notes in Mathematics. Vol. 533. Berlin: Springer-Verlag. doi:10.1007/BFb0080464. ISBN 3540379851.
- Cohen, Frederick R.; Moore, John C.; Neisendorfer, Joseph A. (January 1979). "Torsion in homotopy groups". The Annals of Mathematics. 109 (1): 121–168. doi:10.2307/1971269. JSTOR 1971269.
- Cohen, Frederick R.; Moore, John C.; Neisendorfer, Joseph A. (November 1979). "The double suspension and exponents of the homotopy groups of spheres". The Annals of Mathematics. 110 (3): 549–565. doi:10.2307/1971238. JSTOR 1971238.
- Bahri, Anthony; Bendersky, Martin; Cohen, Frederick R.; Gitler, Samuel (October 2010). "The polyhedral product functor: A method of decomposition for moment-angle complexes, arrangements and related spaces". Advances in Mathematics. 225 (3): 1634–1668. doi:10.1016/j.aim.2010.03.026. S2CID 16069626.

== Personal life ==
In the mid-1970s, Cohen battled a spinal tumor. Although he survived with the help of radiation therapy, he was partially paralyzed for the rest of his life. Starting in 2013, he used a wheelchair.

Cohen was survived by his wife Kathleen and two daughters.
