= Edgar H. Brown =

American mathematician (1926–2021)

Edgar H. Brown, Jr.
- Born: December 27, 1926; Oak Park, Illinois
- Died: December 22, 2021 (aged 94); Newton Highlands, Massachusetts
- Education: Massachusetts Institute of Technology
- Known for: Brown's representability theorem Brown–Peterson cohomology Brown–Gitler spectrum
- Awards: Guggenheim Fellowship
- Scientific career
- Fields: Mathematics
- Workplaces: Brandeis University
- Thesis: Finite Computability of the Homotopy Groups of Finite Groups (1954)
- Doctoral advisor: George W. Whitehead
- Doctoral students: Ralph Cohen; Douglas Ravenel; Terence Gaffney
- Website: people.brandeis.edu/~brown

Edgar Henry Brown, Jr. (December 27, 1926 – December 22, 2021) was an American mathematician specializing in algebraic topology, and for many years a professor at Brandeis University.

== Life ==
Brown was born in Oak Park, Illinois. He completed his bachelor's degree in mathematics at the University of Wisconsin in 1949. He completed his master's degree in mathematics at Washington State University in 1951.

== Career ==
He completed his Ph.D. in mathematics at the Massachusetts Institute of Technology in 1954. His doctoral supervisor was George W. Whitehead, and his doctoral dissertation was on Finite Computability of the Homotopy Groups of Finite Groups.

In 1962–63, he visited the Institute for Advanced Study in Princeton, New Jersey, and in 1964 he received the Guggenheim Fellowship. He was elected a Fellow of the American Academy of Arts and Sciences in 1974 and a Fellow of the American Mathematical Society in 2012.

He died on December 22, 2021, just before his 95th birthday, as a Professor Emeritus of Mathematics at Brandeis University.

== Contributions to mathematics ==
He made numerous contributions to mathematics, including:

- Brown's representability theorem
- Brown–Peterson cohomology
- Brown–Gitler spectrum

His publications include:

- Brown, Edgar H. Jr. (1959). "Twisted tensor products. I.". Annals of Mathematics. 69 (1): 223–246. doi:10.2307/1970101. JSTOR 1970101. MR 0105687.
- Brown, Edgar H. Jr. (1962). "Cohomology theories". Annals of Mathematics. 75 (3): 467–484. doi:10.2307/1970209. JSTOR 1970209. MR 0138104.
- Brown, Edgar H. Jr.; Peterson, Franklin P. (1966). "A spectrum whose $\mathbb{Z}_p$ cohomology is the algebra of reduced $p^{\rm th}$ powers". Topology. 5 (2): 149–154. doi:10.1016/0040-9383(66)90015-2. MR 0192494.
- Brown, Edgar H. Jr.; Gitler, Samuel (1973). "A spectrum whose cohomology is a certain cyclic module over the Steenrod algebra". Topology. 12 (3): 283–295. doi:10.1016/0040-9383(73)90014-1. MR 0391071.
- Brown, Edgar H. (1965). "Abstract homotopy theory". Transactions of the American Mathematical Society. 119 (1): 79–85. doi:10.2307/1994231. JSTOR 1994231.
