= Whitehead conjecture =

The Whitehead conjecture (also known as the Whitehead asphericity conjecture) is a claim in algebraic topology. It was formulated by J. H. C. Whitehead in 1941. It states that every connected subcomplex of a two-dimensional aspherical CW complex is aspherical.

A group presentation $G=(S\mid R)$ is called aspherical if the two-dimensional CW complex $K(S\mid R)$ associated with this presentation is aspherical or, equivalently, if $\pi_2(K(S\mid R))=0$. The Whitehead conjecture is equivalent to the conjecture that every sub-presentation of an aspherical presentation is aspherical.

In 1997, Mladen Bestvina and Noel Brady constructed a group G so that either G is a counterexample to the Eilenberg–Ganea conjecture, or there must be a counterexample to the Whitehead conjecture; in other words, it is not possible for both conjectures to be true.
