= Thomas Banchoff =

American mathematician

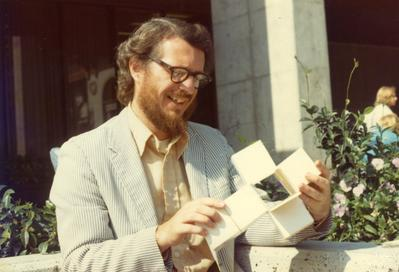
Thomas Banchoff at Berkeley in 1973

Thomas Francis Banchoff (born April 7, 1938) is an American mathematician specializing in geometry. He is a professor at Brown University, where he has taught since 1967. He is known for his research in differential geometry in three and four dimensions, for his efforts to develop methods of computer graphics in the early 1980s, and most recently for his pioneering work in methods of undergraduate education utilizing online resources.

Banchoff graduated from the University of Notre Dame in 1960, receiving his B.A. in Mathematics, and received his Masters and Ph.D. from UC Berkeley in 1962 and 1964, where he was a student of Shiing-Shen Chern. Before going to Brown he taught at Harvard University and the University of Amsterdam.

In 1996 he received the Deborah and Franklin Haimo Award for Distinguished College or University Teaching of Mathematics.

In 2012 he became a fellow of the American Mathematical Society. In addition, he was a president of the Mathematical Association of America.

== Selected works ==
- with Stephen Lovett: Differential Geometry of Curves and Surfaces (2nd edition), A. K. Peters 2010
- with Terence Gaffney, Clint McCrory: Cusps of Gauss Mappings, Pitman 1982
- with John Wermer: Linear Algebra through Geometry, Springer Verlag 1983
- Beyond the third dimension: geometry, computer graphics, and higher dimensions, Scientific American Library, Freeman 1990
- Triple points and surgery of immersed surfaces. Proc. Amer. Math. Soc. 46 (1974), 407–413. (concerning the number of triple points of immersed surfaces in $R^3$.)
- Critical points and curvature for embedded polyhedra. Journal of Differential Geometry 1 (1967), 245–256. (Theorem of Gauß-Bonnet for Polyhedra)

== Teaching Experience ==
- Benjamin Peirce Instructor, Harvard, 1964 - 1966
- Research Associate, Universiteit van Amsterdam, 1966 - 1967;
- Brown University:
  - Asst Professor, 1967
  - Associate Professor 1970
  - Professor 1973 - 2014
- G. Leonard Baker Visiting Professor of Mathematics, Yale, 1998
- Visiting Professor, University of Notre Dame, 2001
- Visiting Professor, UCLA, 2002
- Visiting Professor, University of Georgia, 2006
- Visiting Professor, Stanford University, 2010
- Visiting Professor, Technische Universität Berlin, 2012
- Visiting Professor, Sewanee: the University of the South, 2015
- Visiting Professor, Carnegie Mellon University, 2015
- Visiting Professor, Baylor University, 2016
- Paul Halmos Visiting Professor, Santa Clara University, 2018
