= Brown–Gitler spectrum =

In the mathematical discipline of topology, the Brown–Gitler spectrum is a spectrum whose cohomology is a certain cyclic module over the Steenrod algebra.

Brown–Gitler spectra are defined by the isomorphism:

$$\Sigma^n A/ \{ \operatorname{Sq}^i : 2i > n\} A \cong G(n).$$

== History ==
The concept was introduced by mathematicians Edgar H. Brown and Samuel Gitler in a 1973 paper.

In topology, Brown–Gitler spectrum is related to the concepts of the Segal conjecture (proven in 1984) and the Burnside ring.

== Applications ==
Brown–Gitler spectra have had many important applications in homotopy theory.
