= Samuel Gitler Hammer =

Mexican mathematician (1933-2014)

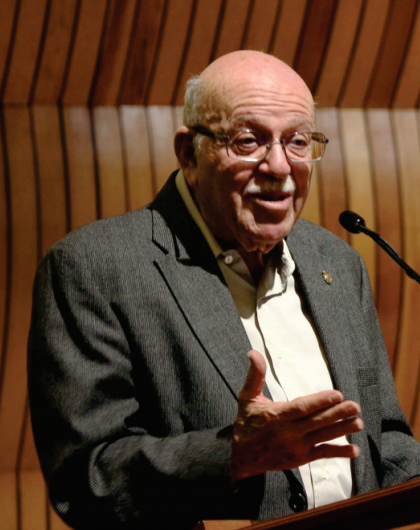
Samuel Gitler in 2014

Samuel Carlos Gitler Hammer (July 14, 1933 – September 9, 2014) was a Mexican mathematician. He was an expert in Yang–Mills theory and is known for the Brown–Gitler spectrum.

Born to a Jewish family in Mexico City, Gitler studied civil engineering at the National Autonomous University of Mexico, graduating in 1956. He then did his graduate studies in mathematics at Princeton University with Norman Steenrod, earning a doctorate in 1960. He taught briefly at Brandeis University and then returned to Mexico, where he was one of the founders of the mathematics department of CINVESTAV.

Gitler was president of the Mexican Mathematical Society from 1967 to 1969, and chair at CINVESTAV from 1973 to 1981. In the late 1980s he moved to the University of Rochester, where he chaired the mathematics department. After retiring from Rochester in 2000, he returned to CINVESTAV.

Gitler won Mexico's National Prize for Science in 1976. In 1986 he became a member of the Colegio Nacional. In 2012 he became a fellow of the American Mathematical Society.

== Publications ==
- Brown, Edgar H. Jr.; Gitler, Samuel (1973). "A spectrum whose cohomology is a certain cyclic module over the Steenrod algebra". Topology. 12 (3): 283–295. doi:10.1016/0040-9383(73)90014-1. MR 0391071.
- Cohen, Frederick R.; Gitler, Samuel (2002). "On loop spaces of configuration spaces". Transactions of the American Mathematical Society. 354 (5): 1705–1748. doi:10.1090/S0002-9947-02-02948-3. MR 1881013.
- Bahri, Anthony; Bendersky, Martin; Cohen, Frederick R.; Gitler, Samuel (2010). "The polyhedral product functor: a method of decomposition for moment-angle complexes, arrangements and related spaces". Advances in Mathematics. 225 (3): 1634–1668. doi:10.1016/j.aim.2010.03.026. MR 2673742. S2CID 16069626.
- Gitler, Samuel; López de Medrano, Santiago (2013). "Intersections of quadrics, moment-angle manifolds and connected sums". Geometry & Topology. 17 (3): 1497–1534. arXiv:0901.2580. doi:10.2140/gt.2013.17.1497. MR 3073929. S2CID 18250349.
