= Acyclic model =

Generalizes showing that two homology theories are isomorphic

In algebraic topology, a discipline within mathematics, the acyclic models theorem can be used to show that two homology theories are isomorphic. The theorem was developed by topologists Samuel Eilenberg and Saunders MacLane. They discovered that, when topologists were writing proofs to establish equivalence of various homology theories, there were numerous similarities in the processes. Eilenberg and MacLane then discovered the theorem to generalize this process.

It can be used to prove the Eilenberg–Zilber theorem; this leads to the idea of the model category.

== Statement of the theorem ==
Let $\mathcal{K}$ be an arbitrary category and $\mathcal{C}(R)$ be the category of chain complexes of $R$-modules over some ring $R$. Let $F,V : \mathcal{K} \to \mathcal{C}(R)$ be covariant functors such that:

- $F_i = V_i = 0$ for $i < 0$.
- There are $\mathcal{M}_k \subseteq \mathcal{K}$ for $k \ge 0$ such that $F_k$ has a basis in $\mathcal{M}_k$, so $F$ is a free functor.
- $V$ is $k$- and $(k+1)$-acyclic at these models, which means that $H_k(V(M)) = 0$ for all $k>0$ and all $M \in \mathcal{M}_k \cup \mathcal{M}_{k+1}$.

Then the following assertions hold:

- Every natural transformation $\varphi : H_0(F) \to H_0(V)$ induces a natural chain map $f : F \to V$.
- If $\varphi,\psi: H_0(F)\to H_0(V)$ are natural transformations, $f,g: F\to V$ are natural chain maps as before and $\varphi^{M}=\psi^{M}$ for all models $M\in\mathcal{M}_0$, then there is a natural chain homotopy between $f$ and $g$.
- In particular the chain map $f$ is unique up to natural chain homotopy.

== Generalizations ==
=== Projective and acyclic complexes ===
What is above is one of the earliest versions of the theorem. Another version is the one that says that if $K$ is a complex of projectives in an abelian category and $L$ is an acyclic complex in that category, then any map $K_0 \to L_0$ extends to a chain map $K\to L$, unique up to homotopy.

This specializes almost to the above theorem if one uses the functor category $\mathcal{C}(R)^\mathcal{K}$ as the abelian category. Free functors are projective objects in that category. The morphisms in the functor category are natural transformations, so the constructed chain maps and homotopies are all natural. The difference is that in the above version, $V$ being acyclic is a stronger assumption than being acyclic only at certain objects.

On the other hand, the above version almost implies this version by letting $\mathcal{K}$ a category with only one object. Then the free functor $F$ is basically just a free (and hence projective) module. $V$ being acyclic at the models (there is only one) means nothing else than that the complex $V$ is acyclic.

=== Acyclic classes ===
There is a grand theorem that unifies both of the above. Let $\mathcal{A}$ be an abelian category (for example, $\mathcal{C}(R)$ or $\mathcal{C}(R)^\mathcal{K}$). A class $\Gamma$ of chain complexes over $\mathcal{A}$ will be called an acyclic class provided that:

- The 0 complex is in $\Gamma$.
- The complex $C$ belongs to $\Gamma$ if and only if the suspension of $C$ does.
- If the complexes $K$ and $L$ are homotopic and $K \in\Gamma$, then $L\in\Gamma$.
- Every complex in $\Gamma$ is acyclic.
- If $D$ is a double complex, all of whose rows are in $\Gamma$, then the total complex of $D$ belongs to $\Gamma$.

There are three natural examples of acyclic classes, although doubtless others exist. The first is that of homotopy contractible complexes. The second is that of acyclic complexes. In functor categories (e.g. the category of all functors from topological spaces to abelian groups), there is a class of complexes that are contractible on each object, but where the contractions might not be given by natural transformations. Another example is again in functor categories but this time the complexes are acyclic only at certain objects.

Let $\Sigma$ denote the class of chain maps between complexes whose mapping cone belongs to $\Gamma$. Although $\Sigma$ does not necessarily have a calculus of either right or left fractions, it has weaker properties of having homotopy classes of both left and right fractions that permit forming the class $\Sigma^{-1} C$ gotten by inverting the arrows in $\Sigma$.

Let $G$ be an augmented endofunctor on $C$, meaning there is given a natural transformation $\epsilon:G\to Id$ (the identity functor on $C$). We say that the chain complex $K$ is $G$-presentable if for each $n$, the chain complex

$$\cdots K_nG^{m+1}\to K_nG^{m}\to \cdots \to K_n$$

belongs to $\Gamma$. The boundary operator is given by

$$\sum (-1)^i K_nG^i\epsilon G^{m-i}:K_nG^{m+1}\to K_nG^m$$.

We say that the chain complex functor $L$ is $G$-acyclic if the augmented chain complex $L\to H_0(L)\to 0$ belongs to $\Gamma$.

Theorem. Let $\Gamma$ be an acyclic class and $\Sigma$ the corresponding class of arrows in the category of chain complexes. Suppose that $K$ is $G$-presentable and $L$ is $G$-acyclic. Then any natural transformation $f_0:H_0(K)\to H_0(L)$ extends, in the category $\Sigma^{-1}(C)$ to a natural transformation of chain functors $f:K\to L$ and this is unique in $\Sigma^{-1}(C)$ up to chain homotopies. If we suppose, in addition, that $L$ is $G$-presentable, that $K$ is $G$-acyclic, and that $f_0$ is an isomorphism, then $f$ is homotopy equivalence.

== Example ==
Here is an example of this last theorem in action. Let $X$ be the category of triangulable spaces and $C$ be the category of abelian group valued functors on $X$. Let $K$ be the singular chain complex functor and $L$ be the simplicial chain complex functor. Let $E: X\to X$ be the functor that assigns to each space $X$ the space

$$\sum_{n\ge 0}\sum_{\textrm{Hom}(\Delta_n,X)}\Delta_n$$.

Here, $\Delta_n$ is the $n$-simplex and this functor assigns to $X$ the sum of as many copies of each $n$-simplex as there are maps $\Delta_n\to X$. Then let $G$ be defined by $G(C)=CE$. There is an obvious augmentation $EX\to X$ and this induces one on $G$. It can be shown that both $K$ and $L$ are both $G$-presentable and $G$-acyclic (the proof that $L$ is presentable and acyclic is not entirely straightforward and uses a detour through simplicial subdivision, which can also be handled using the above theorem). The class $\Gamma$ is the class of homology equivalences. It is rather obvious that $H_0(K)\simeq H_0(L)$ and so we conclude that singular and simplicial homology are isomorphic on $X$.

There are many other examples in both algebra and topology, some of which are described in
