= Ganea conjecture =

Ganea's conjecture is a now disproved claim in algebraic topology. It states that

$$\operatorname{cat}(X \times S^n)=\operatorname{cat}(X) +1$$

for all $n>0$, where $\operatorname{cat}(X)$ is the Lusternik–Schnirelmann category of a topological space X, and S^{n} is the n-dimensional sphere.

The inequality

$$\operatorname{cat}(X \times Y) \le \operatorname{cat}(X) +\operatorname{cat}(Y)$$

holds for any pair of spaces, $X$ and $Y$. Furthermore, $\operatorname{cat}(S^n)=1$, for any sphere $S^n$, $n>0$. Thus, the conjecture amounts to $\operatorname{cat}(X \times S^n)\ge\operatorname{cat}(X) +1$.

The conjecture was formulated by Tudor Ganea in 1971. Many particular cases of this conjecture were proved, and Norio Iwase gave a counterexample to the general case in 1998. In a follow-up paper from 2002, Iwase gave an even stronger counterexample, with X a closed smooth manifold. This counterexample also disproved a related conjecture, which stated that

$$\operatorname{cat}(M \setminus \{p\})=\operatorname{cat}(M) -1 ,$$

for a closed manifold $M$ and $p$ a point in $M$.

A minimum dimensional counterexample to the conjecture was constructed by Don Stanley and Hugo Rodríguez Ordóñez in 2010. It has dimension 7 and $\operatorname{cat}(X) = 2$, and for sufficiently large $n$, $\operatorname{cat}(X \times S^n)$ is also 2.

This work raises the question: For which spaces X is the Ganea condition, $\operatorname{cat}(X\times S^n) = \operatorname{cat}(X) + 1$, satisfied? It has been conjectured that these are precisely the spaces X for which $\operatorname{cat}(X)$ equals a related invariant, $\operatorname{Qcat}(X).$
