= Thomas W. Hungerford =

American mathematician

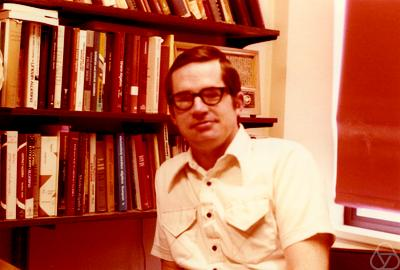
- Born: March 21, 1936; Oak Park, Illinois, U.S.
- Died: November 28, 2014 (aged 78); St. Louis, Missouri, U.S.
- Education: College of the Holy Cross (BA); University of Chicago (PhD)
- Scientific career
- Fields: Algebraic topology
- Workplaces: University of Washington; Cleveland State University; St. Louis University
- Thesis: Bockstein spectra (1963)
- Doctoral advisor: Saunders Mac Lane

Thomas William Hungerford (March 21, 1936 – November 28, 2014) was an American mathematician who worked in algebra and mathematics education. He is the author or coauthor of several widely used and widely cited textbooks covering high-school to graduate-level mathematics. From 1963 until 1980, he taught at the University of Washington and then at Cleveland State University until 2003. From 2003–2014 he was at Saint Louis University. Hungerford had a special interest in promoting the use of technology to teach mathematics.

== Early life and education ==
Hungerford was born in Oak Park, Illinois, in 1936. At age 16, he moved to St. Louis, Missouri, where he attended St. Louis University High School and graduated as the valedictorian of his high school class.

After high school, Hungerford enrolled at the College of the Holy Cross in Worcester, Massachusetts, graduating with a Bachelor of Arts, summa cum laude, in mathematics in 1958. As an undergraduate at Holy Cross, he wrote a senior thesis on topological space. He then pursued graduate studies at the University of Chicago, where he earned his Ph.D. in mathematics in 1963 under the supervision of mathematician Saunders Mac Lane. His doctoral dissertation was titled, "Bockstein spectra".

== Academic career ==
After receiving his doctorate in 1963, Hungerford began teaching mathematics at the University of Washington in Seattle, where he remained until 1980. During his years at Washington, he published research on subjects including Bockstein spectra, hyperhomology, multilinear maps, and the structure of principal ideal rings. In a 1968 paper in the Pacific Journal of Mathematics, he proved that every principal ideal ring is a finite direct sum of rings, each of which is a homomorphic image of a principal ideal domain.

Hungerford's graduate-level textbook Algebra was originally published by Holt, Rinehart and Winston in 1974 and was subsequently issued by Springer as volume 73 of its Graduate Texts in Mathematics series. The book covers groups, rings, modules, fields and Galois theory, linear algebra, commutative rings and modules, ring structure, and category theory. In 1980, Hungerford moved from Washington to Cleveland State University, where he taught mathematics until 2001.

In addition to his research in algebra, Hungerford published work in mathematics education and authored or coauthored more than a dozen mathematics textbooks from the high-school level to graduate level. He promoted the use of technology in mathematics instruction, served as a referee and reviewer for mathematical journals, and participated on National Science Foundation panels that evaluated grant applications. After returning to St. Louis in 2003, Hungerford maintained an office at Saint Louis University until 2013, when he retired from writing and revising textbooks. His later textbooks included works in abstract algebra, precalculus, college algebra, trigonometry, finite mathematics, and applied mathematics.

== Bibliography ==
=== Graduate ===
- 1974 Algebra (Graduate Texts in Mathematics #73). Springer Verlag. ISBN 3-540-90518-9

=== Undergraduate ===
- 1997 Abstract Algebra: An Introduction, 2nd Edition. Cengage. ISBN 0-03-010559-5
- 2005 Contemporary College Algebra and Trigonometry, 2nd Edition. Cengage. ISBN 0-534-46665-6
- 2005 Contemporary College Algebra, 2nd Edition. Cengage. ISBN 0-534-46656-7
- 2006 Contemporary Trigonometry. Cengage. ISBN 0-534-46638-9
- 2009 Contemporary Precalculus, 5th Edition (with Douglas J. Shaw). Cengage. ISBN 0-495-55441-3
- 2011 Mathematics with Applications, 10th Edition (with Margaret L. Lial and John P. Holcomb, Jr). Pearson. ISBN 0-321-64632-0
- 2011 Finite Mathematics with Applications, 10th Edition (with Margaret L. Lial and John P. Holcomb, Jr). Pearson. ISBN 0-321-64554-5
- 2013 Abstract Algebra: An Introduction, 3rd Edition, Cengage. ISBN 1-111-56962-2

=== High school ===
- 2002 Precalculus: A Graphing Approach (with Irene Jovell and Betty Mayberry). Holt, Rinehart & Winston. ISBN 0-03-056511-1
