= Tudor Ganea =

Romanian-American mathematician

- Born: 17 October 1922; Kingdom of Romania
- Died: August 1971 (aged 48); Seattle, United States
- Resting place: Lake View Cemetery, Seattle
- Education: University of Bucharest; University of Paris
- Known for: Eilenberg–Ganea theorem Eilenberg–Ganea conjecture Ganea conjecture
- Scientific career
- Fields: Mathematics
- Workplaces: University of Bucharest; Purdue University; University of Washington
- Thesis: Sur quelques invariants numeriques du type d'homotopie (1962)
- Doctoral advisor: Henri Cartan
- Other academic advisors: Simion Stoilow

Tudor Ganea (October 17, 1922 –August 1971) was a Romanian-American mathematician, known for his work in algebraic topology, especially homotopy theory. Ganea left Communist Romania to settle in the United States in the early 1960s. He taught at the University of Washington.

== Life and work ==
He studied mathematics at the University of Bucharest, and then started his research as a member of Simion Stoilow's seminar on complex functions. His papers from 1949 to 1952 were on covering spaces, topological groups, symmetric products, and the Lusternik–Schnirelmann category. During this time, he earned his candidate thesis in topology under the direction of Stoilow.

In 1957, Ganea published in the Annals of Mathematics a short, yet influential paper with Samuel Eilenberg, in which the Eilenberg–Ganea theorem was proved and the celebrated Eilenberg–Ganea conjecture was formulated. The conjecture is still open.

By 1958, Ganea and his mentee, Israel Berstein, were the two leading algebraic topologists in Romania. Later that year at an international conference on geometry and topology in Iași, the two met Peter Hilton, starting long mathematical collaborations. Ganea left for France in 1961, where he obtained in 1962 his Ph.D. from the University of Paris under Henri Cartan, with thesis Sur quelques invariants numeriques du type d'homotopie. He then emigrated to the United States. After spending a year at Purdue University in West Lafayette, Indiana, he joined the faculty at the University of Washington in Seattle.

During this time, he tried to get Aurora Cornu (his fiancée at the time) out of Romania, but did not succeed. In 1962, he gave an invited talk at the International Congress of Mathematicians in Stockholm, titled On some numerical homotopy invariants.

Just before he died, Ganea attended the Symposium on Algebraic Topology, held February 22–26, 1971 at the Battelle Seattle Research Center, in Seattle. At the symposium, he was not able to give a talk, but he did distribute a preprint containing a list of unsolved problems. One of these problems, regarding the Lusternik–Schnirelmann category, came to be known as Ganea's conjecture. A version of this conjecture for rational spaces was proved by Kathryn Hess in her 1989 MIT Ph.D. thesis. Many particular cases of Ganea's original conjecture were proved, until Norio Iwase provided a counterexample in 1998. A minimum dimensional counterexample to Ganea's conjecture was constructed by Don Stanley and Hugo Rodríguez Ordóñez in 2010.

Ganea is buried at Lake View Cemetery in Seattle.

== Publications ==
- Eilenberg, Samuel; Ganea, Tudor (1957). "On the Lusternik–Schnirelmann category of abstract groups". Annals of Mathematics. 2nd Ser. 65 (3): 517–518. doi:10.2307/1970062. JSTOR 1970062. MR 0085510.
- Vrănceanu, Gheorghe; Ganea, Tudor (1961). "Topological embeddings of lens spaces". Proceedings of the Cambridge Philosophical Society. 57 (3): 688–690. Bibcode:1961PCPS...57..688V. doi:10.1017/S0305004100035751. MR 0124908. S2CID 122012809.
- Ganea, Tudor; Hilton, Peter J.; Peterson, Frank P. (1962). "On the homotopy-commutativity of loop-spaces and suspensions". Topology. 1 (2): 133–141. doi:10.1016/0040-9383(65)90021-2. MR 0150774.
- Ganea, Tudor (1965). "A generalization of the homology and homotopy suspension". Commentarii Mathematici Helvetici. 39: 295–322. doi:10.1007/BF02566956. MR 0179791. S2CID 120467739.
- Ganea, Tudor (1967). "Lusternik–Schnirelmann category and strong category". Illinois Journal of Mathematics. 11 (3): 417–427. doi:10.1215/ijm/1256054563. MR 0229240.
- Ganea, Tudor (1971), Some problems on numerical homotopy invariants, Lecture Notes in Mathematics, vol. 249, Berlin: Springer, pp. 13–22, MR 0339147
