= John Coleman Moore =

American mathematician

- Born: May 27, 1923; Staten Island, New York, U.S.
- Died: January 1, 2016 (aged 92); Rochester, New York, U.S.
- Education: Massachusetts Institute of Technology (BA); Brown University (PhD)
- Known for: Borel–Moore homology Eilenberg–Moore spectral sequence Milnor–Moore theorem Moore space (algebraic topology)
- Scientific career
- Fields: Mathematics
- Workplaces: Princeton University; University of Rochester
- Doctoral advisor: George W. Whitehead
- Doctoral students: Paul Baum; William Browder; Robin Hartshorne; Eric Lander; J. Peter May; Haynes Miller; Joseph Neisendorfer; Michael Rosen; James Stasheff; Richard Swan; Robert Thomason

John Coleman Moore (May 27, 1923 – January 1, 2016) was an American mathematician. The Borel−Moore homology and Eilenberg–Moore spectral sequence are named after him.

== Early life and education ==
Moore was born in 1923 in Staten Island, New York. He received his B.A. in 1948 from the Massachusetts Institute of Technology and his Ph.D. in 1952 from Brown University under the supervision of George W. Whitehead.

== Career ==
Moore began his career at Princeton University as an instructor, and was eventually promoted to full professor in 1961. He retired from Princeton in 1989, after which he took a half-time position at the University of Rochester.

His most-cited paper is on Hopf algebras, co-authored with John Milnor. As a faculty member at Princeton University, he advised 24 students and is the academic ancestor of over 1000 mathematicians. He was an Invited Speaker at the International Congress of Mathematicians in 1958 in Edinburgh and in 1970 in Nice.

In 1983, a conference on K-theory was held at Princeton in honor of Moore's 60th birthday. In 2012, he became a fellow of the American Mathematical Society. He died in 2016 at the age of 92.

== Publications ==
- Moore, John C. (May 1954). "On Homotopy Groups of Spaces with a Single Non-Vanishing Homology Group". Annals of Mathematics. 2. 59 (3): 549–557. doi:10.2307/1969718. JSTOR 1969718. MR 0061382.
- Cohen, Frederick R.; Moore, John C.; Neisendorfer, Joseph A. (1979). "Torsion in homotopy groups". Annals of Mathematics. (2). 109 (1): 121–168. doi:10.2307/1971269. JSTOR 1971269. MR 0519355.
- Cohen, Frederick R.; Moore, John C.; Neisendorfer, Joseph A. (1979). "The double suspension and exponents of the homotopy groups of spheres". Annals of Mathematics. (2). 110 (3): 549–565. doi:10.2307/1971238. JSTOR 1971238. MR 0519355.
