= Saunders Mac Lane =

American mathematician (1909–2005)

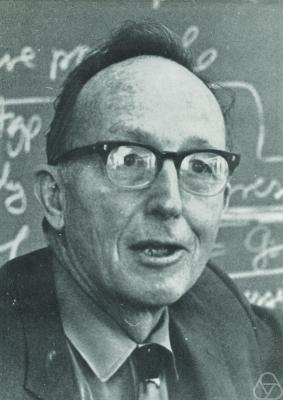
- Born: Leslie Saunders MacLane; August 4, 1909; Norwich, Connecticut, U.S.
- Died: April 14, 2005 (aged 95); San Francisco, California, U.S.
- Education: Yale University (BA); University of Chicago (MA); University of Göttingen (PhD)
- Known for: Acyclic model Category theory Shuffle algebra Standard complex Mac Lane coherence theorem Mac Lane set theory Mac Lane's condition Mac Lane's planarity criterion Eilenberg–MacLane space Steinitz–Mac Lane exchange lemma
- Spouse(s): Dorothy Jones (m. 1934); Osa Segal (m.1986)
- Awards: Chauvenet Prize (1941); Leroy P. Steele Prize (1986); National Medal of Science (1989)
- Scientific career
- Fields: Mathematical logic Algebraic number theory Algebraic topology
- Workplaces: Harvard University; Cornell University; University of Chicago; Columbia University
- Doctoral advisor: Hermann Weyl; Paul Bernays
- Doctoral students: Steve Awodey; David Eisenbud; William Howard; Thomas Hungerford; Irving Kaplansky; Roger Lyndon; Michael D. Morley; Anil Nerode; Robert Solovay; John G. Thompson

Saunders Mac Lane (August 4, 1909 – April 14, 2005), born Leslie Saunders MacLane, was an American mathematician who co-founded category theory with Samuel Eilenberg.

== Early life and education ==
Mac Lane was born in Norwich, Connecticut, near where his family lived in Taftville. He was christened "Leslie Saunders MacLane", but "Leslie" fell into disuse because his parents, Donald MacLane and Winifred Saunders, came to dislike it. He began inserting a space into his surname because his first wife found it difficult to type the name without a space. He was the eldest of three brothers; one of his brothers, Gerald MacLane, also became a mathematics professor at Rice University and Purdue University. Another sister died as a baby. His father and grandfather were both ministers; his grandfather had been a Presbyterian, but was kicked out of the church for believing in evolution, and his father was a Congregationalist. His mother, Winifred, studied at Mount Holyoke College and taught English, Latin, and mathematics.

In high school, Mac Lane's favorite subject was chemistry. While in high school, his father died, and he came under his grandfather's care. His half-uncle, a lawyer, was determined to send him to Yale University, where many of his relatives had been educated, and paid his way there beginning in 1926. As a freshman, he became disillusioned with chemistry. His mathematics instructor, Lester S. Hill, coached him for a local mathematics competition which he won, setting the direction for his future work. He went on to study mathematics and physics as a double major, taking courses from Jesse Beams, Ernest William Brown, Ernest Lawrence, F. S. C. Northrop, and Øystein Ore, among others. He graduated from Yale with a B.A. in 1930. During this period, he published his first scientific paper, in physics and co-authored with Irving Langmuir.

In 1929, at a party of Yale football supporters in Montclair, New Jersey, Mac Lane (there to be presented with a prize for having the best grade point average yet recorded at Yale) had met Robert Maynard Hutchins, the new president of the University of Chicago, who encouraged him to go there for his graduate studies and soon afterwards offered him a scholarship. Mac Lane neglected to actually apply to the program, but showed up and was admitted anyway. At Chicago, the subjects he studied included set theory with E. H. Moore, number theory with Leonard Eugene Dickson, the calculus of variations with Gilbert Ames Bliss, and logic with Mortimer J. Adler.

In 1931, having earned his master's degree and feeling restless at Chicago, he earned a fellowship from the Institute of International Education and became one of the last Americans to study at the University of Göttingen prior to its decline under the Nazis. His greatest influences there were Paul Bernays and Hermann Weyl. By the time he finished his doctorate in 1934, Bernays had been forced to leave because he was Jewish, and Weyl became his main examiner. At Göttingen, Mac Lane also studied with Gustav Herglotz and Emmy Noether. Within days of finishing his degree, he married Dorothy Jones, from Chicago, and soon returned to the U.S.

== Career ==
From 1934 through 1938, Mac Lane held short-term appointments at Yale University, Harvard University, Cornell University, and the University of Chicago. He then held a tenure track appointment at Harvard from 1938 to 1947. In 1941, while giving a series of visiting lectures at the University of Michigan, he met Samuel Eilenberg and began what would become a fruitful collaboration on the interplay between algebra and topology. In 1944 and 1945, he directed Columbia University's Applied Mathematics Group, which was involved in the war effort as a contractor for the Applied Mathematics Panel; the mathematics he worked on in this group concerned differential equations for fire-control systems.

In 1947, he accepted an offer to return to Chicago, where (in part because of the university's involvement in the Manhattan Project, and in part because of the administrative efforts of Marshall Stone) many other famous mathematicians and physicists had also recently moved. He traveled as a Guggenheim Fellow to ETH Zurich for the 1947–1948 term, where he worked with Heinz Hopf. Mac Lane succeeded Stone as department chair in 1952, and served for six years.

He was vice president of the National Academy of Sciences and the American Philosophical Society, and president of the American Mathematical Society. While presiding over the Mathematical Association of America in the 1950s, he initiated its activities aimed at improving the teaching of modern mathematics. He was a member of the National Science Board from 1974 to 1980, advising the American government. In 1976, he led a delegation of mathematicians to China to study the conditions affecting mathematics there. Mac Lane was elected to the National Academy of Sciences in 1949, and received the National Medal of Science in 1989. He died in 2005.

== Contributions ==
MacLane and Samuel Eilenberg at a conference in July 1992

After a thesis in mathematical logic, Mac Lane's early work was in field theory and valuation theory. He wrote on valuation rings and Witt vectors, and separability in infinite field extensions. He started writing on group extensions in 1942, and in 1943 began his research on what is now called Eilenberg–MacLane spaces K(G,n), having a single non-trivial homotopy group G in dimension n. This work opened the way to group cohomology in general.

After introducing, via the Eilenberg–Steenrod axioms, the abstract approach to homology theory, he and Eilenberg originated category theory in 1945. He is especially known for his work on coherence theorems. A recurring feature of category theory, abstract algebra, and of some other mathematics as well, is the use of diagrams, consisting of arrows (morphisms) linking objects, such as products and coproducts. According to McLarty (2005), this diagrammatic approach to contemporary mathematics largely stems from Mac Lane (1948), who also coined the term Yoneda lemma for a lemma which is an essential background to many central concepts of category theory and which was discovered by Nobuo Yoneda.

Mac Lane had an exemplary devotion to writing approachable texts, starting with his very influential A Survey of Modern Algebra, coauthored in 1941 with Garrett Birkhoff. From then on, it was possible to teach elementary modern algebra to undergraduates using an English text. His Categories for the Working Mathematician remains the definitive introduction to category theory.

== Selected works ==
- 1997 (1941). A Survey of Modern Algebra (with Garrett Birkhoff). A K Peters. ISBN 1-56881-068-7
- 1948, "Groups, categories and duality," Proceedings of the Nat. Acad. of Sciences of the USA 34: 263–67.
- 1963. MacLane, Saunders (October 1963). "Natural Associativity and Commutativity". Rice Institute Pamphlet - Rice University Studies. hdl:1911/62865.
- 1995 (1963). Homology, Springer (Classics in Mathematics) ISBN 978-0-387-58662-5 (Originally, Band 114 of Die Grundlehren Der Mathematischen Wissenschaften in Einzeldarstellungen.) AMS review by David Buchsbaum.
- 1999 (1967). Algebra (with Garrett Birkhoff). Chelsea. ISBN 0-8218-1646-2
- 1998 (1972). Categories for the Working Mathematician, Springer (Graduate Texts in Mathematics) ISBN 0-387-98403-8
- 1986. Mathematics, Form and Function. Springer-Verlag. ISBN 0-387-96217-4
- 1992. Sheaves in Geometry and Logic: A First Introduction to Topos Theory (with Ieke Moerdijk). ISBN 0-387-97710-4
- 1995. "Mathematics at Gottingen under the Nazis" (PDF). Notices of the AMS. 42 (10): 1134–38.
- 2005. Saunders Mac Lane: A Mathematical Autobiography. A K Peters. ISBN 1-56881-150-0

== See also ==
- Foundations of geometry
- PROP (category theory)
- SPQR tree
