= Brown's representability theorem =

On representability of a contravariant functor on the category of connected CW complexes

In mathematics, Brown's representability theorem in homotopy theory gives necessary and sufficient conditions for a contravariant functor F on the homotopy category Hotc of pointed connected CW complexes, to the category of sets Set, to be a representable functor.

More specifically, we are given

F: Hotc^{op} → Set,

and there are certain obviously necessary conditions for F to be of type Hom(—, C), with C a pointed connected CW-complex that can be deduced from category theory alone. The statement of the substantive part of the theorem is that these necessary conditions are then sufficient. For technical reasons, the theorem is often stated for functors to the category of pointed sets; in other words the sets are also given a base point.

The theorem is due to Edgar H. Brown who published it in 1962.

== Statement of the theorem for CW complexes ==
Suppose that:

1. The functor F: Hotc^{op} → Set maps coproducts (i.e. wedge sums) in Hotc to products in Set: $F(\vee_\alpha X_\alpha) \cong \prod_\alpha F(X_\alpha),$
2. The functor F maps homotopy pushouts in Hotc to weak pullbacks. This is often stated as a Mayer–Vietoris axiom: for any CW complex W covered by two subcomplexes U and V, and any elements u ∈ F(U), v ∈ F(V) such that u and v restrict to the same element of F(U ∩ V), there is an element w ∈ F(W) restricting to u and v, respectively.

Then F is representable by some CW complex C, that is to say there is an isomorphism

F(Z) ≅ Hom_{Hotc}(Z, C)

for any CW complex Z, which is natural in Z in that for any morphism from Z to another CW complex Y the induced maps F(Y) → F(Z) and Hom_{Hot}(Y, C) → Hom_{Hot}(Z, C) are compatible with these isomorphisms.

The converse statement also holds: any functor represented by a CW complex satisfies the above two properties. This direction is an immediate consequence of basic category theory, so the deeper and more interesting part of the equivalence is the other implication.

The representing object C above can be shown to depend functorially on F: any natural transformation from F to another functor satisfying the conditions of the theorem necessarily induces a map of the representing objects. This is a consequence of Yoneda's lemma.

Taking F(X) to be the singular cohomology group H^{i}(X,A) with coefficients in a given abelian group A, for fixed i > 0; then the representing space for F is the Eilenberg–MacLane space K(A, i). This gives a means of showing the existence of Eilenberg-MacLane spaces.

== Variants ==
Since the homotopy category of CW-complexes is equivalent to the localization of the category of all topological spaces at the weak homotopy equivalences, the theorem can equivalently be stated for functors on a category defined in this way.

However, the theorem is false without the restriction to connected pointed spaces, and an analogous statement for unpointed spaces is also false.

A similar statement does, however, hold for spectra instead of CW complexes. Brown also proved a general categorical version of the representability theorem, which includes both the version for pointed connected CW complexes and the version for spectra.

A version of the representability theorem in the case of triangulated categories is due to Amnon Neeman. Together with the preceding remark, it gives a criterion for a (covariant) functor F: C → D between triangulated categories satisfying certain technical conditions to have a right adjoint functor. Namely, if C and D are triangulated categories with C compactly generated and F a triangulated functor commuting with arbitrary direct sums, then F has a right adjoint. Neeman has applied this to proving the Grothendieck duality theorem in algebraic geometry.

Jacob Lurie has proved a version of the Brown representability theorem for the homotopy category of a pointed quasicategory with a compact set of generators which are cogroup objects in the homotopy category. For instance, this applies to the homotopy category of pointed connected CW complexes, as well as to the unbounded derived category of a Grothendieck abelian category (in view of Lurie's higher-categorical refinement of the derived category).
