= Eilenberg–Zilber theorem =

Links the homology groups of a product space with those of the individual spaces

In mathematics, specifically in algebraic topology, the Eilenberg–Zilber theorem is an important result in establishing the link between the homology groups of a product space $X \times Y$ and those of the spaces $X$ and $Y$. The theorem first appeared in a 1953 paper in the American Journal of Mathematics by Samuel Eilenberg and Joseph A. Zilber. One possible route to a proof is the acyclic model theorem.

== Statement of the theorem ==
The theorem can be formulated as follows. Suppose $X$ and $Y$ are topological spaces. Then we have the three chain complexes $C_*(X)$, $C_*(Y)$, and $C_*(X \times Y)$. (The argument applies equally to the simplicial or singular chain complexes.) We also have the tensor product complex $C_*(X) \otimes C_*(Y)$, whose differential is, by definition,

$$\partial_{C_*(X) \otimes C_*(Y)}( \sigma \otimes \tau) = \partial_X \sigma \otimes \tau + (-1)^p \sigma \otimes \partial_Y\tau$$

for $\sigma \in C_p(X)$ and $\partial_X$, $\partial_Y$ the differentials on $C_*(X)$,$C_*(Y)$.

Then the theorem says that we have chain maps

$$F\colon C_*(X \times Y) \rightarrow C_*(X) \otimes C_*(Y), \quad G\colon C_*(X) \otimes C_*(Y) \rightarrow C_*(X \times Y)$$

such that $FG$ is the identity and $GF$ is chain-homotopic to the identity. Moreover, the maps are natural in $X$ and $Y$. Consequently the two complexes must have the same homology:

$$H_*(C_*(X \times Y)) \cong H_*(C_*(X) \otimes C_*(Y)).$$

== Statement in terms of composite maps ==
The original theorem was proven in terms of acyclic models but explicit formulas for the map $G$ and the homotopy $H$ were later found by Eilenberg and Mac Lane. The standard map $F$ they produce is traditionally referred to as the Alexander–Whitney map and $G$ the Eilenberg–Zilber map. The maps are natural in both $X$ and $Y$ and inverse up to homotopy: one has

$$FG = \mathrm{id}_{C_*(X) \otimes C_*(Y)}, \qquad GF - \mathrm{id}_{C_*(X \times Y)} = \partial_{C_*(X) \otimes C_*(Y)}H+H\partial_{C_*(X) \otimes C_*(Y)}$$

for a homotopy $H$ natural in both $X$ and $Y$ such that further, each of $HH$, $FH$, and $HG$ is zero. This is what would come to be known as a contraction or a homotopy retract datum.

== The coproduct ==
The diagonal map $\Delta\colon X \to X \times X$ induces a map of cochain complexes $C_*(X) \to C_*(X \times X)$ which, followed by the Alexander–Whitney $F$ yields a coproduct $C_*(X) \to C_*(X) \otimes C_*(X)$ inducing the standard coproduct on $H_*(X)$. With respect to these coproducts on $X$ and $Y$, the map

$$H_*(X) \otimes H_*(Y) \to H_*\big(C_*(X) \otimes C_*(Y)\big)\ \overset\sim\to\ H_*(X \times Y)$$,

also called the Eilenberg–Zilber map, becomes a map of differential graded coalgebras. The composite $C_*(X) \to C_*(X) \otimes C_*(X)$ itself is not a map of coalgebras.

== Statement in cohomology ==
The Alexander–Whitney and Eilenberg–Zilber maps dualize (over any choice of commutative coefficient ring $k$ with unity) to a pair of maps

$$G^*\colon C^*(X \times Y) \rightarrow \big(C_*(X) \otimes C_*(Y)\big)^*, \quad F^*\colon \big(C_*(X) \otimes C_*(Y)\big)^*\rightarrow C^*(X \times Y)$$

which are also homotopy equivalences, as witnessed by the duals of the preceding equations, using the dual homotopy $H^*$. The coproduct does not dualize straightforwardly, because dualization does not distribute over tensor products of infinitely-generated modules, but there is a natural injection of differential graded algebras $i\colon C^*(X) \otimes C^*(Y) \to \big(C_*(X) \otimes C_*(Y)\big)^*$ given by $\alpha \otimes \beta \mapsto (\sigma \otimes \tau \mapsto \alpha(\sigma)\beta(\tau))$, the product being taken in the coefficient ring $k$. This $i$ induces an isomorphism in cohomology, so one does have the zig-zag of differential graded algebra maps

$$C^*(X) \otimes C^*(X)\ \overset{i}{\to}\ \big(C_*(X) \otimes C_*(X)\big)^*\ \overset{G^*}{\leftarrow}\ C^*(X \times X) \overset{C^*(\Delta)}{\to} C^*(X)$$

inducing a product $\smile\colon H^*(X) \otimes H^*(X) \to H^*(X)$ in cohomology, known as the cup product, because $H^*(i)$ and $H^*(G)$ are isomorphisms. Replacing $G^*$ with $F^*$ so the maps all go the same way, one gets the standard cup product on cochains, given explicitly by

$$\alpha \otimes \beta \mapsto \Big(\sigma \mapsto (\alpha \otimes \beta)(F^*\Delta^*\sigma) =
\sum_{p=0}^{\dim \sigma} \alpha(\sigma|_{\Delta^{[0,p]}}) \cdot \beta(\sigma|_{\Delta^{[p,\dim \sigma]}})\Big)$$,

which, since cochain evaluation $C^p(X) \otimes C_q(X) \to k$ vanishes unless $p=q$, reduces to the more familiar expression.

Note that if this direct map $C^*(X) \otimes C^*(X) \to C^*(X)$ of cochain complexes were in fact a map of differential graded algebras, then the cup product would make $C^*(X)$ a commutative graded algebra, which it is not. This failure of the Alexander–Whitney map to be a coalgebra map is an example the unavailability of commutative cochain-level models for cohomology over fields of nonzero characteristic, and thus is in a way responsible for much of the subtlety and complication in stable homotopy theory.

== Generalizations ==
An important generalisation to the non-abelian case using crossed complexes is given in the paper by Andrew Tonks below. This give full details of a result on the (simplicial) classifying space of a crossed complex stated but not proved in the paper by Ronald Brown and Philip J. Higgins on classifying spaces.

== Consequences ==
The Eilenberg–Zilber theorem is a key ingredient in establishing the Künneth theorem, which expresses the homology groups $H_*(X \times Y)$ in terms of $H_*(X)$ and $H_*(Y)$. In light of the Eilenberg–Zilber theorem, the content of the Künneth theorem consists in analysing how the homology of the tensor product complex relates to the homologies of the factors.

== See also ==
- Acyclic model
