= Double complex =

Mathematical concept

In mathematics, specifically Homological algebra, a double complex is a generalization of a chain complex where instead of having a $\mathbb{Z}$-grading, the objects in the bicomplex have a $\mathbb{Z}\times\mathbb{Z}$-grading. The most general definition of a double complex, or a bicomplex, is given with objects in an additive category $\mathcal{A}$. A bicomplex is a sequence of objects $C_{p,q} \in \text{Ob}(\mathcal{A})$ with two differentials, the horizontal differential

$d^h: C_{p,q} \to C_{p+1,q}$

and the vertical differential

$d^v:C_{p,q} \to C_{p,q+1}$

which have the compatibility relation

$d_h\circ d_v = d_v\circ d_h$

Hence a double complex is a commutative diagram of the form

$$\begin{matrix}
& & \vdots & & \vdots & &  \\
& & \uparrow & & \uparrow & & \\
\cdots & \to & C_{p,q+1} & \to & C_{p+1,q+1} & \to & \cdots \\
& & \uparrow & & \uparrow & & \\
\cdots & \to & C_{p,q} & \to & C_{p+1,q} & \to & \cdots \\
& & \uparrow & & \uparrow & & \\
& & \vdots & & \vdots & &  \\
\end{matrix}$$

where the rows and columns form chain complexes.

Some authors instead require that the squares anticommute. That is

$d_h\circ d_v + d_v\circ d_h = 0.$

This eases the definition of Total Complexes. By setting $f_{p,q} = (-1)^p d^v_{p,q} \colon C_{p,q} \to C_{p,q-1}$, we can switch between having commutativity and anticommutativity. If the commutative definition is used, this alternating sign will have to show up in the definition of Total Complexes.

== Examples ==
There are many natural examples of bicomplexes that come up in nature. In particular, for a Lie groupoid, there is a bicomplex associated to it^{pg 7-8} which can be used to construct its de-Rham complex.

Another common example of bicomplexes are in Hodge theory, where on an almost complex manifold $X$ there's a bicomplex of differential forms $\Omega^{p,q}(X)$ whose components are linear or anti-linear. For example, if $z_1,z_2$ are the complex coordinates of $\mathbb{C}^2$ and $\overline{z}_1,\overline{z}_2$ are the complex conjugate of these coordinates, a $(1,1)$-form is of the form

$f_{a,b}dz_a\wedge d\overline{z}_b$

== See also ==
- Chain complex
- Derived algebraic geometry

=== Additional applications ===
- https://web.archive.org/web/20210708183754/http://www.dma.unifi.it/~vezzosi/papers/tou.pdf
