= Eilenberg–Ganea conjecture =

Conjecture in algebraic topology

The Eilenberg–Ganea conjecture is a claim in algebraic topology. It was formulated by Samuel Eilenberg and Tudor Ganea in 1957, in a short but influential paper. It states that if a group G has cohomological dimension 2, then it has a 2-dimensional Eilenberg–MacLane space $K(G,1)$. For n different from 2, a group G of cohomological dimension n has an n-dimensional Eilenberg–MacLane space. It is also known that a group of cohomological dimension 2 has a 3-dimensional Eilenberg−MacLane space.

In 1997, Mladen Bestvina and Noel Brady constructed a group G so that either G is a counterexample to the Eilenberg–Ganea conjecture, or there must be a counterexample to the Whitehead conjecture; in other words, it is not possible for both conjectures to be true.
