= Terence Gaffney =

American mathematician

- Born: July 9, 1948 (age 78); Pennsylvania, United States
- Education: Boston College, Brandeis University
- Scientific career
- Fields: Mathematics
- Workplaces: Northeastern University
- Doctoral advisor: Edgar Henry Brown Jr., Harold Levine

Terence Gaffney (born 9 March 1948) is an American mathematician who has made fundamental contributions to singularity theory – in particular, to the fields of singularities of maps and equisingularity theory.

== Professional career ==
He is a Professor of Mathematics at Northeastern University. He did his undergraduate studies at Boston College. He received his Ph.D. from Brandeis University in 1975 under the direction of Edgar Henry Brown Jr. and Harold Levine. In 1975 he became an AMS Centennial Fellow at MIT and a year later he joined the Brown University faculty as Tamarkind instructor. In 1979 Gaffney became professor at Northeastern University where he has remained ever since. He has served as department chair, graduate director, chair of the undergraduate curriculum committee, and faculty senator.

== Selected publications ==
- Gaffney, T. (1976), "On the order of determination of a finitely determined germ", Inventiones Mathematicae, 37 (2): 83–92, Bibcode:1976InMat..37...83G, doi:10.1007/BF01418963, S2CID 120952434.
- Gaffney, T. (1979), "A note on the order of determination of a finitely determined germ", Inventiones Mathematicae, 52 (2): 127–130, Bibcode:1979InMat..52..127G, doi:10.1007/BF01403059, S2CID 119519319.
- Gaffney, T.; Lazarsfeld, Robert L. (1980), "On the ramification of branched coverings of P^n", Inventiones Mathematicae, 59: 53–58, Bibcode:1980InMat..59...53G, doi:10.1007/BF01390313, S2CID 121387129.
- Gaffney, T.; du Plessis, A.A. (1982), "More on the determinacy of smooth map-germs", Inventiones Mathematicae, 66: 137–163, Bibcode:1982InMat..66..137G, doi:10.1007/BF01404761, S2CID 120417306.
- Gaffney, T.; Damon, J.N. (1983), "Topological triviality of deformations of functions and Newton filtrations", Inventiones Mathematicae, 72 (3): 335–358, Bibcode:1983InMat..72..335D, doi:10.1007/BF01398391, S2CID 121284485.
- Gaffney, T.; Hauser, H. (1985), "Characterizing singularities of varieties of mappings", Inventiones Mathematicae, 81 (3): 427–447, Bibcode:1985InMat..81..427G, doi:10.1007/BF01388580, S2CID 122597073.
- Gaffney, T. (1988), "Multiple points, chaining and Hilbert schemes", Amer. J. Math., 110 (4): 595–628, doi:10.2307/2374643, JSTOR 2374643.
- Gaffney, T. (1992), "Integral closure of modules and Whitney equisingularity", Inventiones Mathematicae, 107: 301–322, Bibcode:1992InMat.107..301G, doi:10.1007/BF01231892, S2CID 121234668.
- Gaffney, T. (1993), "Polar multiplicities and equisingularity of map germs", Topology, 32: 185–223, Bibcode:1992InMat.107..301G, doi:10.1007/BF01231892, S2CID 121234668.
- Gaffney, T. (1993), "Punctual Hilbert schemes and resolutions of multiple point singularities", Math. Ann., 295: 269–289, doi:10.1007/BF01444888, S2CID 122728280.
- Gaffney, T. (1996), "Multiplicities and equsingularity of ICIS germs", Inventiones Mathematicae, 123 (2): 209–220, doi:10.1007/s002220050022, S2CID 189819930.
- Gaffney, T.; Kleiman, Steven L. (1999), "Specialization of integral dependence for modules", Inventiones Mathematicae, 137 (3): 541–574, arXiv:alg-geom/9610003, Bibcode:1999InMat.137..541G, doi:10.1007/s002220050335, S2CID 7215999.
- Gaffney, T. (2009), "The Multiplicity Polar Theorem and isolated singularities", J. Algebraic Geom., 18 (3): 547–574, arXiv:math/0509285, doi:10.1090/S1056-3911-08-00516-X, S2CID 18078670.

== See also ==
- Mather-Gaffney criterion
