= Samuel Eilenberg =

Polish-American mathematician (1913–1998)

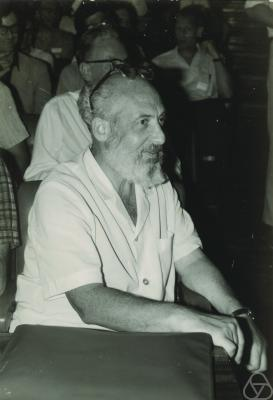
- Samuel Eilenberg (1970)
- Born: September 30, 1913; Warsaw, Congress Poland, Russian Empire
- Died: January 30, 1998 (aged 84); New York City, United States
- Citizenship: Russian, Polish, American
- Education: University of Warsaw
- Known for: Acyclic model Category theory X-machine; Weak dimension Projective module Shuffle algebra Simplicial set Standard complex Eilenberg's obstruction theory Eilenberg swindle Eilenberg–Ganea conjecture Eilenberg–Ganea theorem Eilenberg–MacLane space Eilenberg–Moore spectral sequence Eilenberg–Niven theorem Eilenberg–Steenrod axioms Eilenberg–Zilber theorem Cartan–Eilenberg resolution Chevalley–Eilenberg complex
- Awards: Sierpiński Medal (1991); Wolf Prize (1986); Leroy P. Steele Prize (1987)
- Scientific career
- Fields: Mathematics
- Workplaces: University of Michigan Columbia University Indiana University
- Thesis: On the Topological Applications of Maps onto a Circle (1936)
- Doctoral advisors: Kazimierz Kuratowski; Karol Borsuk
- Doctoral students: Jonathan Beck; David Buchsbaum; Martin Golumbic; Daniel Kan; William Lawvere; Ramaiyengar Sridharan; Myles Tierney

Samuel Eilenberg (September 30, 1913 – January 30, 1998) was a Polish-American mathematician who co-founded category theory (with Saunders Mac Lane) and homological algebra. He also founded the field of algebraic automata in his work with Jesse B. Wright .

== Early life and education ==
He was born in Warsaw, Kingdom of Poland to a Jewish family. He spent much of his career as a professor at Columbia University.

He earned his Ph.D. from University of Warsaw in 1936, with thesis On the Topological Applications of Maps onto a Circle; his thesis advisors were Kazimierz Kuratowski and Karol Borsuk.

== Career ==
Eilenberg's main body of work was in algebraic topology. He worked on the axiomatic treatment of homology theory with Norman Earl Steenrod (and the Eilenberg–Steenrod axioms are named for the pair), and on homological algebra with Saunders Mac Lane. As a result of this work, Eilenberg and Mac Lane developed the field of category theory, for which they are now best known.

Eilenberg was a member of Bourbaki and, with Henri Cartan, wrote the 1956 book Homological Algebra.

Later in life he worked mainly in pure category theory, being one of the founders of the field. The Eilenberg swindle (or telescope) is a construction applying the telescoping cancellation idea to projective modules.

Eilenberg contributed to automata theory and algebraic automata theory. In particular, he introduced a model of computation called X-machine and a new prime decomposition algorithm for finite state machines in the vein of Krohn–Rhodes theory. He also identified a natural correspondence between certain classes of regular languages called varieties and pseudovarieties of finite monoids, a result which is now known as Eilenberg's theorem. He died in New York City in January 1998.

== Art collection ==
Eilenberg was also a prominent collector of Asian art. His collection mainly consisted of small sculptures and other artifacts from India, Indonesia, Nepal, Thailand, Cambodia, Sri Lanka and Central Asia. In 1991–1992, the Metropolitan Museum of Art in New York staged an exhibition from more than 400 items that Eilenberg had donated to the museum, entitled The Lotus Transcendent: Indian and Southeast Asian Art From the Samuel Eilenberg Collection. In reciprocity, the Metropolitan Museum of Art donated substantially to the endowment of the Samuel Eilenberg Visiting Professorship in Mathematics at Columbia University.

== Selected publications ==
Saunders Mac Lane and Eilenberg at a conference in July 1992

- Eilenberg, Samuel (1974). Automata, Languages and Machines, Volume A. Academic Press. ISBN 0-12-234001-9.
- Eilenberg, Samuel (1976). Automata, Languages and Machines, Volume B. Academic Press. ISBN 0-12-234002-7.
- Eilenberg, Samuel; Ganea, Tudor (1957). "On the Lusternik-Schnirelmann category of abstract groups". Annals of Mathematics. 2nd Series. 65 (3): 517–518. doi:10.2307/1970062. JSTOR 1970062. MR 0085510.
- Eilenberg, Samuel; Mac Lane, Saunders (1945). "Relations between homology and homotopy groups of spaces". Annals of Mathematics. 46 (3): 480–509. doi:10.2307/1969165. JSTOR 1969165.
- Eilenberg, Samuel; Mac Lane, Saunders (1950). "Relations between homology and homotopy groups of spaces. II". Annals of Mathematics. 51 (3): 514–533. doi:10.2307/1969365. JSTOR 1969365.
- Eilenberg, Samuel; Moore, John C. (1962), "Limits and spectral sequences", Topology, 1 (1): 1–23, doi:10.1016/0040-9383(62)90093-9, ISSN 0040-9383
- Eilenberg, Samuel; Niven, Ivan (1944). "The "fundamental theorem of algebra" for quaternions". Bulletin of the American Mathematical Society. 50 (4): 246–248. doi:10.1090/s0002-9904-1944-08125-1. MR 0009588.
- Eilenberg, Samuel; Steenrod, Norman E. (1945). "Axiomatic approach to homology theory". Proceedings of the National Academy of Sciences of the United States of America. 31 (4): 117–120. Bibcode:1945PNAS...31..117E. doi:10.1073/pnas.31.4.117. PMC 1078770. PMID 16578143.
- Eilenberg, Samuel; Steenrod, Norman E. (1952). Foundations of Algebraic Topology. Princeton, New Jersey: Princeton University Press. MR 0050886.

== See also ==
- Stefan Banach
- Stanislaw Ulam
- Eilenberg–Montgomery fixed point theorem
