= Aspherical space =

In topology, a branch of mathematics, an aspherical space is a path connected topological space with all homotopy groups $\pi_n(X)$ equal to 0 when $n\not = 1$.

If one works with CW complexes, one can reformulate this condition: an aspherical CW complex is a CW complex whose universal cover is contractible. Indeed, contractibility of a universal cover is the same, by Whitehead's theorem, as asphericality of it. And it is an application of the exact sequence of a fibration that higher homotopy groups of a space and its universal cover are same. (By the same argument, if E is a path-connected space and $p\colon E \to B$ is any covering map, then E is aspherical if and only if B is aspherical.)

Each aspherical space X is, by definition, an Eilenberg–MacLane space of type $K(G,1)$, where $G = \pi_1(X)$ is the fundamental group of X. Also directly from the definition, an aspherical space is a classifying space for its fundamental group (considered to be a topological group when endowed with the discrete topology).

== Examples ==
- Using the second of above definitions we easily see that all orientable compact surfaces of genus greater than 0 are aspherical (as they have either the Euclidean plane or the hyperbolic plane as a universal cover).
- It follows that all non-orientable surfaces, except the real projective plane, are aspherical as well, as they can be covered by an orientable surface of genus 1 or higher.
- Similarly, a product of any number of circles is aspherical. As is any complete, Riemannian flat manifold.
- Any hyperbolic 3-manifold is, by definition, covered by the hyperbolic 3-space H^{3}, hence aspherical. As is any n-manifold whose universal covering space is hyperbolic n-space H^{n}.
- Let X = G/K be a Riemannian symmetric space of negative type, and Γ be a lattice in G that acts freely on X. Then the locally symmetric space $\Gamma\backslash G/K$ is aspherical.
- The Bruhat–Tits building of a simple algebraic group over a field with a discrete valuation is aspherical.
- The complement of a knot in S^{3} is aspherical, by the sphere theorem.
- Complete metric spaces with nonpositive curvature in the sense of Aleksandr D. Aleksandrov (locally CAT(0) spaces) are aspherical. In the case of Riemannian manifolds, this follows from the Cartan–Hadamard theorem, which has been generalized to geodesic metric spaces by Mikhail Gromov and Hans Werner Ballmann. This class of aspherical spaces subsumes all the previously given examples.
- Any nilmanifold is aspherical.

== Symplectically aspherical manifolds ==
In the context of symplectic manifolds, the meaning of "aspherical" is a little bit different. Specifically, we say that a symplectic manifold (M,ω) is symplectically aspherical if and only if

$$\int_{S^2}f^*\omega=\langle c_1(TM),f_*[S^2]\rangle=0$$

for every continuous mapping

$$f\colon S^2 \to M,$$

where $c_1(TM)$ denotes the first Chern class of an almost complex structure which is compatible with ω.

By Stokes' theorem, we see that symplectic manifolds which are aspherical are also symplectically aspherical manifolds. However, there do exist symplectically aspherical manifolds which are not aspherical spaces.

Some references drop the requirement on c_{1} in their definition of "symplectically aspherical." However, it is more common for symplectic manifolds satisfying only this weaker condition to be called "weakly exact."

== See also ==
- Acyclic space
- Essential manifold
- Whitehead conjecture
