= Glossary of category theory =

This is a glossary of properties and concepts in category theory in mathematics, including those in topos theory. (See also Outline of category theory.)

- Notes on foundations: In many expositions (e.g., Vistoli), the set-theoretic issues are ignored; this means, for instance, that one does not distinguish between small and large categories and that one can arbitrarily form a localization of a category. Like those expositions, this glossary also generally ignores the set-theoretic issues, except when they are relevant (e.g., the discussion on accessibility.)

Especially for higher categories, the concepts from algebraic topology are also used in the category theory. For that see also glossary of algebraic topology.

The notations and the conventions used throughout the article are:

- [n] = {0, 1, 2, …, n}, which is viewed as a category (by writing $i \to j \Leftrightarrow i \le j$.)
- Cat, the category of (small) categories, where the objects are categories (which are small with respect to some universe) and the morphisms functors.
- Fct(C, D), the functor category: the category of functors from a category C to a category D.
- Set, the category of (small) sets.
- sSet, the category of simplicial sets.
- "weak" instead of "strict" is given the default status; e.g., "n-category" means "weak n-category", not the strict one, by default.
- By an ∞-category, we mean a quasi-category, the most popular model, unless other models are being discussed.
- The number zero 0 is a natural number.

== !$@ ==
2-category
1. A 2-category is a generalization of a category where there are also 2-morphisms between morphisms.
2. A (2, 1)-category is a 2-category in which every 2-morphism is invertible.

== A ==
abelian
A category is abelian if it has a zero object, it has all pullbacks and pushouts, and all monomorphisms and epimorphisms are normal.
accessible
1. Given a cardinal number κ, an object X in a category is κ-accessible (or κ-compact or κ-presentable) if $\operatorname{Hom}(X, -)$ commutes with κ-filtered colimits.
2. Given a regular cardinal κ, a category is κ-accessible if it has κ-filtered colimits and there exists a small set S of κ-compact objects that generates the category under colimits, meaning every object can be written as a colimit of diagrams of objects in S.
additive
A category is additive if it is preadditive (to be precise, has some pre-additive structure) and admits all finite coproducts. Although "preadditive" is an additional structure, one can show "additive" is a property of a category; i.e., one can ask whether a given category is additive or not.
adequate
An adequate subcategory is a subcategory on which the Yoneda embedding of the ambient category is still fully faithful.
adjunction
An adjunction (also called an adjoint pair) is a pair of functors F: C → D, G: D → C such that there is a "natural" bijection

$$\operatorname{Hom}_D (F(X), Y) \simeq \operatorname{Hom}_C (X, G(Y))$$;

F is said to be left adjoint to G and G to right adjoint to F. Here, "natural" means there is a natural isomorphism $\operatorname{Hom}_D (F(-), -) \simeq \operatorname{Hom}_C (-, G(-))$ of bifunctors (which are contravariant in the first variable.)
algebra for a monad
Given a monad T in a category X, an algebra for T or a T-algebra is an object in X with a monoid action of T ("algebra" is misleading and "T-object" is perhaps a better term.) For example, given a group G that determines a monad T in Set in the standard way, a T-algebra is a set with an action of G.
algebraic
An algebraic category is a category that is monadic over Set.
amnestic
A functor is amnestic if it has the property: if k is an isomorphism and F(k) is an identity, then k is an identity.
anodyne
anodyne extension

== B ==
balanced
A category is balanced if every bimorphism (i.e., both mono and epi) is an isomorphism.
Beck's theorem
Beck's theorem characterizes the category of algebras for a given monad.
bicategory
A bicategory is a model of a weak 2-category.
bifunctor
A bifunctor from a pair of categories C and D to a category E is a functor C × D → E. For example, for any category C, $\operatorname{Hom}(-, -)$ is a bifunctor from C^{op} and C to Set.
bimonoidal
A bimonoidal category is a category with two monoidal structures, one distributing over the other.
bimorphism
A bimorphism is a morphism that is both an epimorphism and a monomorphism.
Bousfield localization
See Bousfield localization.

== C ==
calculus of functors
The calculus of functors is a technique of studying functors in the manner similar to the way a function is studied via its Taylor series expansion; whence, the term "calculus".
calculus of fractions
calculus of fractions.
cartesian closed
A category is cartesian closed if it has a terminal object and that any two objects have a product and exponential.
cartesian functor
Given relative categories $p: F \to C, q: G \to C$ over the same base category C, a functor $f: F \to G$ over C is cartesian if it sends cartesian morphisms to cartesian morphisms.
cartesian morphism
1. Given a functor π: C → D (e.g., a prestack over schemes), a morphism f: x → y in C is π-cartesian if, for each object z in C, each morphism g: z → y in C and each morphism v: π(z) → π(x) in D such that π(g) = π(f) ∘ v, there exists a unique morphism u: z → x such that π(u) = v and g = f ∘ u.
2. Given a functor π: C → D (e.g., a prestack over rings), a morphism f: x → y in C is π-coCartesian if, for each object z in C, each morphism g: x → z in C and each morphism v: π(y) → π(z) in D such that π(g) = v ∘ π(f), there exists a unique morphism u: y → z such that π(u) = v and g = u ∘ f. (In short, f is the dual of a π-cartesian morphism.)
Cartesian square
A commutative diagram that is isomorphic to the diagram given as a fiber product.
categorical logic
Categorical logic is an approach to mathematical logic that uses category theory.
categorical probability
categorical probability
categorification
categorification is a process of replacing sets and set-theoretic concepts with categories and category-theoretic concepts in some nontrivial way to capture categoric flavors. Decategorification is the reverse of categorification.

The theory of categories originated ... with the need to guide complicated calculations involving passage to the limit in the study of the qualitative leap from spaces to homotopical/homological objects. ... But category theory does not rest content with mere classification in the spirit of Wolffian metaphysics (although a few of its practitioners may do so); rather it is the mutability of mathematically precise structures (by morphisms) which is the essential content of category theory.

— William Lawvere,
category
A category consists of the following data
1. A class of objects,
2. For each pair of objects X, Y, a set $\operatorname{Hom}(X, Y)$, whose elements are called morphisms from X to Y,
3. For each triple of objects X, Y, Z, a map (called composition)
  $$\circ: \operatorname{Hom}(Y, Z) \times \operatorname{Hom}(X, Y) \to \operatorname{Hom}(X, Z), \, (g, f) \mapsto g \circ f$$,
4. For each object X, an identity morphism $\operatorname{id}_X \in \operatorname{Hom}(X, X)$

subject to the conditions: for any morphisms $f: X \to Y$, $g: Y \to Z$ and $h: Z \to W$,

- $(h \circ g) \circ f = h \circ (g \circ f)$ and $\operatorname{id}_Y \circ f = f \circ \operatorname{id}_X = f$.
For example, a partially ordered set can be viewed as a category: the objects are the elements of the set and for each pair of objects x, y, there is a unique morphism $x \to y$ if and only if $x \le y$; the associativity of composition means transitivity.
category of
1. The category of (small) categories, denoted by Cat, is a category where the objects are all the categories which are small with respect to some fixed universe and the morphisms are all the functors.
2. Category of modules, Category of topological spaces, Category of groups, Category of metric spaces, etc.
classifying space
The classifying space of a category C is the geometric realization of the nerve of C.
co-
Often used synonymous with op-; for example, a colimit refers to an op-limit in the sense that it is a limit in the opposite category. But there might be a distinction; for example, an op-fibration is not the same thing as a cofibration.
codensity monad
Codensity monad.
coend
The coend of a functor $F: C^{\text{op}} \times C \to X$ is the dual of the end of F and is denoted by

$$\int^{c \in C} F(c, c)$$.

For example, if R is a ring, M a right R-module and N a left R-module, then the tensor product of M and N is

$$M \otimes_R N = \int^{R} M \otimes_{\mathbb{Z}} N$$

where R is viewed as a category with one object whose morphisms are the elements of R.
coequalizer
The coequalizer of a pair of morphisms $f, g: A \to B$ is the colimit of the pair. It is the dual of an equalizer.
coherator
coherator
coherence theorem
A coherence theorem is a theorem of a form that states a weak structure is equivalent to a strict structure.
coherent
1. A coherent category.
2. A coherent topos.
cohesive
cohesive category.
coimage
The coimage of a morphism f: X → Y is the coequalizer of $X \times_Y X \rightrightarrows X$.
colored operad
Another term for multicategory, a generalized category where a morphism can have several domains. The notion of "colored operad" is more primitive than that of operad: in fact, an operad can be defined as a colored operad with a single object.
comma
Given functors $f: C \to B, g: D \to B$, the comma category $(f \downarrow g)$ is a category where (1) the objects are morphisms $f(c) \to g(d)$ and (2) a morphism from $\alpha: f(c) \to g(d)$ to $\beta: f(c') \to g(d')$ consists of $c \to c'$ and $d \to d'$ such that $f(c) \to f(c') \overset{\beta}\to g(d')$ is $f(c) \overset{\alpha}\to g(d) \to g(d').$ For example, if f is the identity functor and g is the constant functor with a value b, then it is the slice category of B over an object b.
comonad
A comonad in a category X is a comonoid in the monoidal category of endofunctors of X.
compact
Probably synonymous with accessible.
complete
A category is complete if all small limits exist.
completeness
Deligne's completeness theorem; see .
composition
1. A composition of morphisms in a category is part of the datum defining the category.
2. If $f: C \to D, \, g: D \to E$ are functors, then the composition $g \circ f$ or $gf$ is the functor defined by: for an object x and a morphism u in C, $(g \circ f)(x) = g(f(x)), \, (g \circ f)(u) = g(f(u))$.
3. Natural transformations are composed pointwise: if $\varphi: f \to g, \, \psi: g \to h$ are natural transformations, then $\psi \circ \varphi$ is the natural transformation given by $(\psi \circ \varphi)_x = \psi_x \circ \varphi_x$.
computad
computad.
concrete
A concrete category C is a category such that there is a faithful functor from C to Set; e.g., Vec, Grp and Top.
cone
A cone is a way to express the universal property of a colimit (or dually a limit). One can show that the colimit $\varinjlim$ is the left adjoint to the diagonal functor $\Delta: C \to \operatorname{Fct}(I, C)$, which sends an object X to the constant functor with value X; that is, for any X and any functor $f: I \to C$,

$$\operatorname{Hom}(\varinjlim f, X) \simeq \operatorname{Hom}(f, \Delta_X),$$

provided the colimit in question exists. The right-hand side is then the set of cones with vertex X.
connected
A category is connected if, for each pair of objects x, y, there exists a finite sequence of objects z_{i} such that $z_0 = x, z_n = y$ and either $\operatorname{Hom}(z_i, z_{i+1})$ or $\operatorname{Hom}(z_{i+1}, z_i)$ is nonempty for any i.
conservative functor
A conservative functor is a functor that reflects isomorphisms. Many forgetful functors are conservative, but the forgetful functor from Top to Set is not conservative.
constant
A functor is constant if it maps every object in a category to the same object A and every morphism to the identity on A. Put in another way, a functor $f: C \to D$ is constant if it factors as: $C \to \{ A \} \overset{i}\to D$ for some object A in D, where i is the inclusion of the discrete category { A }.
contravariant functor
A contravariant functor F from a category C to a category D is a (covariant) functor from C^{op} to D. It is sometimes also called a presheaf especially when D is Set or the variants. For example, for each set S, let $\mathfrak{P}(S)$ be the power set of S and for each function $f: S \to T$, define

$$\mathfrak{P}(f): \mathfrak{P}(T) \to \mathfrak{P}(S)$$

by sending a subset A of T to the pre-image $f^{-1}(A)$. With this, $\mathfrak{P}: \mathbf{Set} \to \mathbf{Set}$ is a contravariant functor.
coproduct
The coproduct of a family of objects X_{i} in a category C indexed by a set I is the inductive limit $\varinjlim$ of the functor $I \to C, \, i \mapsto X_i$, where I is viewed as a discrete category. It is the dual of the product of the family. For example, a coproduct in Grp is a free product.
core
The core of a category is the maximal groupoid contained in the category.
cubical
A cubical set is an alternative for a simplicial set; a simplex is replaced by a cube.

== D ==
Dagger compact category
Dagger compact category.
Day convolution
Given a group or monoid M, the Day convolution is the tensor product in $\mathbf{Fct}(M, \mathbf{Set})$.
Dendroidal
Dendroidal set.
dense
A dense subcategory is another name for an adequate subcategory.
density theorem
The density theorem states that every presheaf (a set-valued contravariant functor) is a colimit of representable presheaves. Yoneda's lemma embeds a category C into the category of presheaves on C. The density theorem then says the image is "dense", so to say. The name "density" is because of the analogy with the Jacobson density theorem (or other variants) in abstract algebra.
diagonal functor
1. Given categories I, C, the diagonal functor is the functor

$$\Delta: C \to \mathbf{Fct}(I, C), \, A \mapsto \Delta_A$$

that sends each object A to the constant functor with value A and each morphism $f: A \to B$ to the natural transformation $\Delta_{f, i}: \Delta_A(i) = A \to \Delta_B(i) =B$ that is f at each i.
diagram
1. Given a category C, a diagram in C is a functor $f: I \to C$ from a category I. For example, if $I = \mathbb{N}$ with no morphisms other than the identities, a diagram simply amounts to a sequence of objects. For a general I, typically there is a morphism between the images of objects in I under f (whence the term diagram).
2. simplicial diagram, a diagram from the opposite $\Delta^{\textrm{op}}$ of the simplex category.
diagrammatic set
A diagrammatic set is an alternative to a simplicial set or a cubical set.
differential graded category
A differential graded category is a category whose Hom sets are equipped with structures of differential graded modules. In particular, if the category has only one object, it is the same as a differential graded module.
direct limit
A direct limit is the colimit of a direct system.
discrete
A category is discrete if each morphism is an identity morphism (of some object). For example, a set can be viewed as a discrete category.
distributor
Another term for "profunctor".
double
double category.
Dwyer–Kan equivalence
A Dwyer–Kan equivalence is a generalization of an equivalence of categories to the simplicial context.

== E ==
Elementary
1. An elementary topos is a category with exponentials and a subobject classifier. Philosophically it is similar to a Grothendieck topos.
2. The Elementary Theory of Abstract Categories.
3. The Elementary Theory of the Category of Sets.
4. The Elementary Theory of the Category of Categories.
Eilenberg–Moore category
Another name for the category of algebras for a given monad.
Eilenberg–Zilber category
Eilenberg–Zilber category.
empty
The empty category is a category with no object. It is the same thing as the empty set when the empty set is viewed as a discrete category.
end
The end of a functor $F: C^{\text{op}} \times C \to X$ is the limit

$$\int_{c \in C} F(c, c) = \varprojlim (F^{\#}: C^{\#} \to X)$$

where $C^{\#}$ is the category (called the subdivision category of C) whose objects are symbols $c^{\#}, u^{\#}$ for all objects c and all morphisms u in C and whose morphisms are $b^{\#} \to u^{\#}$ and $u^{\#} \to c^{\#}$ if $u: b \to c$ and where $F^{\#}$ is induced by F so that $c^{\#}$ would go to $F(c, c)$ and $u^{\#}, u: b \to c$ would go to $F(b, c)$. For example, for functors $F, G: C \to X$,

$$\int_{c \in C} \operatorname{Hom}(F(c), G(c))$$

is the set of natural transformations from F to G. For more examples, see this mathoverflow thread. The dual of an end is a coend.
endofunctor
A functor between the same category.
enriched category
Given a monoidal category (C, ⊗, 1), a category enriched over C is, informally, a category whose Hom sets are in C. More precisely, a category D enriched over C is a data consisting of
1. A class of objects,
2. For each pair of objects X, Y in D, an object $\operatorname{Map}_D(X, Y)$ in C, called the mapping object from X to Y,
3. For each triple of objects X, Y, Z in D, a morphism in C,
  $$\circ: \operatorname{Map}_D(Y, Z) \otimes \operatorname{Map}_D(X, Y) \to \operatorname{Map}_D(X, Z)$$,
  called the composition,
4. For each object X in D, a morphism $1_X: 1 \to \operatorname{Map}_D(X, X)$ in C, called the unit morphism of X

subject to the conditions that (roughly) the compositions are associative and the unit morphisms act as the multiplicative identity.

For example, a category enriched over sets is an ordinary category.
epimorphism
A morphism f is an epimorphism if $g=h$ whenever $g\circ f=h\circ f$. In other words, f is the dual of a monomorphism.
equalizer
The equalizer of a pair of morphisms $f, g: A \to B$ is the limit of the pair. It is the dual of a coequalizer.
equivalence
1. A functor is an equivalence if it is faithful, full and essentially surjective.
2. A morphism in an ∞-category C is an equivalence if it gives an isomorphism in the homotopy category of C.
equivalent
A category is equivalent to another category if there is an equivalence between them.
essentially surjective
A functor F is called essentially surjective (or isomorphism-dense) if for every object B there exists an object A such that F(A) is isomorphic to B.
evaluation
Given categories C, D and an object A in C, the evaluation at A is the functor

$$\mathbf{Fct}(C, D) \to D, \,\, F \mapsto F(A).$$

For example, the Eilenberg–Steenrod axioms give an instance when the functor is an equivalence.
exact
1. An exact sequence is typically a sequence (from arbitrary negative integers to arbitrary positive integers) of maps

$$\cdots \to E_1 \overset{f_1}\to E_2 \overset{f_2}\to E_3 \to \cdots$$

such that the image of $f_i$ is the kernel of $f_{i+1}$. The notion can be generalized in various ways.

2. A short exact sequence is a sequence of the form $0 \to E \to F \to G \to 0$.
3. A functor (for example, between abelian categories) is said to be exact if it takes short exact sequences to short exact sequences.
4. An exact category is roughly a category where there is the notion of a short exact sequence.
5. An exact category in the sense of Barr.
exit
exit-path category

== F ==
faithful
A functor is faithful if it is injective when restricted to each hom-set.
fundamental category
The fundamental category functor $\tau_1: s\mathbf{Set} \to \mathbf{Cat}$ is the left adjoint to the nerve functor N. For every category C, $\tau_1 NC = C$.
fundamental groupoid
1. The fundamental groupoid of a topological space X is a category where the objects are the points on X and the morphisms the homotopy classes of paths.
2. The fundamental groupoid of a Kan complex X is the category where an object is a 0-simplex (vertex) $\Delta^0 \to X$, a morphism is a homotopy class of a 1-simplex (path) $\Delta^1 \to X$ and a composition is determined by the Kan property.
fibered category
A functor π: C → D is said to exhibit C as a category fibered over D if, for each morphism g: x → π(y) in D, there exists a π-cartesian morphism f: x' → y in C such that π(f) = g. If D is the category of affine schemes (say of finite type over some field), then π is more commonly called a prestack. Note: π is often a forgetful functor and in fact the Grothendieck construction implies that every fibered category can be taken to be that form (up to equivalences in a suitable sense).
fiber product
Given a category C and a set I, the fiber product over an object S of a family of objects X_{i} in C indexed by I is the product of the family in the slice category $C_{/S}$ of C over S (provided there are $X_i \to S$). The fiber product of two objects X and Y over an object S is denoted by $X \times_S Y$ and is also called a Cartesian square.
fibrant
An object is fibrant if the unique morphism from it to the final object is a fibration, when there is a notion of a fibration.
filtered
1. A filtered category (also called a filtrant category) is a nonempty category with the properties (1) given objects i and j, there are an object k and morphisms i → k and j → k and (2) given morphisms u, v: i → j, there are an object k and a morphism w: j → k such that w ∘ u = w ∘ v. A category I is filtered if and only if, for each finite category J and functor f: J → I, the set $\varprojlim \operatorname{Hom}(f(j), i)$ is nonempty for some object i in I.
2. Given a cardinal number π, a category is said to be π-filtrant if, for each category J whose set of morphisms has cardinal number strictly less than π, the set $\varprojlim \operatorname{Hom}(f(j), i)$ is nonempty for some object i in I.
final
Synonymous with terminal
finitary monad
A finitary monad or an algebraic monad is a monad on Set whose underlying endofunctor commutes with filtered colimits.
finite
A category is finite if it has only finitely many morphisms.
forgetful functor
The forgetful functor is, roughly, a functor that loses some of data of the objects; for example, the functor $\mathbf{Grp} \to \mathbf{Set}$ that sends a group to its underlying set and a group homomorphism to itself is a forgetful functor.
free category
The free category generated by a graph $G$ is a category together with the map $G \to UC$ = the underlying graph of $C$ such that (1) the objects are exactly the vertices of $G$ and (2) $G \to UD$ for a category $D$ uniquely factors through $G \to UC$. For example, $[n] = \{ 0, \cdots, n \}$ is a free category.
free completion
free completion, free cocompletion.
free functor
A free functor is a left adjoint to a forgetful functor. For example, for a ring R, the functor that sends a set X to the free R-module generated by X is a free functor (whence the name).
Frobenius category
A Frobenius category is an exact category that has enough injectives and enough projectives and such that the class of injective objects coincides with that of projective objects.
Fukaya category
See Fukaya category.
full
1. A functor is full if it is surjective when restricted to each hom-set.
2. A category A is a full subcategory of a category B if the inclusion functor from A to B is full.
functor
Given categories C, D, a functor F from C to D is a structure-preserving map from C to D; i.e., it consists of an object F(x) in D for each object x in C and a morphism F(f) in D for each morphism f in C satisfying the conditions: (1) $F(f \circ g) = F(f) \circ F(g)$ whenever $f \circ g$ is defined and (2) $F(\operatorname{id}_x) = \operatorname{id}_{F(x)}$. For example,

$$\mathfrak{P}: \mathbf{Set} \to \mathbf{Set}, \, S \mapsto \mathfrak{P}(S)$$,

where $\mathfrak{P}(S)$ is the power set of S is a functor if we define: for each function $f: S \to T$, $\mathfrak{P}(f): \mathfrak{P}(S) \to \mathfrak{P}(T)$ by $\mathfrak{P}(f)(A) = f(A)$.
functor category
The functor category Fct(C, D) or $D^C$ from a category C to a category D is the category where the objects are all the functors from C to D and the morphisms are all the natural transformations between the functors.

== G ==
Gabriel–Popescu theorem
The Gabriel–Popescu theorem says an abelian category is a quotient of the category of modules.
Galois category
1. In SGA 1, Exposé V (Definition 5.1.), a category is called a Galois category if it is equivalent to the category of finite G-sets for some profinite group G.
2. For technical reasons, some authors (e.g., Stacks project or) use slightly different definitions.
generator
In a category C, a family of objects $G_i, i \in I$ is a system of generators of C if the functor $X \mapsto \prod_{i \in I} \operatorname{Hom}(G_i, X)$ is conservative. Its dual is called a system of cogenerators.
generalized
generalized metric space.
graph
This term is often refers to a quiver.
Gray
1. A Gray tensor product is a lax analog of a Cartesian product.
2. A Gray category is a certain semi-strict 3-category; see https://ncatlab.org/nlab/show/Gray-category
gros topos
The notion of a gros topos (of topological spaces) is due to Jean Giraud.
Grothendieck's Galois theory
A category-theoretic generalization of Galois theory; see Grothendieck's Galois theory.
Grothendieck category
A Grothendieck category is a certain well-behaved kind of an abelian category.
Grothendieck construction
Given a functor $U: C \to \mathbf{Cat}$, let D_{U} be the category where the objects are pairs (x, u) consisting of an object x in C and an object u in the category U(x) and a morphism from (x, u) to (y, v) is a pair consisting of a morphism f: x → y in C and a morphism U(f)(u) → v in U(y). The passage from U to D_{U} is then called the Grothendieck construction.
Grothendieck fibration
A fibered category.
groupoid
1. A category is called a groupoid if every morphism in it is an isomorphism.
2. An ∞-category is called an ∞-groupoid if every morphism in it is an equivalence (or equivalently if it is a Kan complex.)

== H ==
Hall algebra of a category
See Ringel–Hall algebra.
heart
The heart of a t-structure ($D^{\ge 0}$, $D^{\le 0}$) on a triangulated category is the intersection $D^{\ge 0} \cap D^{\le 0}$. It is an abelian category.
higher category theory
Higher category theory is a subfield of category theory that concerns the study of n-categories and ∞-categories.
higher stack
A higher stack is a generalization of a stack to higher categories.
homological dimension
The homological dimension of an abelian category with enough injectives is the least non-negative integer n such that every object in the category admits an injective resolution of length at most n. The dimension is ∞ if no such integer exists. For example, the homological dimension of Mod_{R} with a principal ideal domain R is at most one.
homotopy category
See homotopy category. It is closely related to a localization of a category.
homotopy colimit
Thomason's homotopy colimit theorem.
homotopy hypothesis
The homotopy hypothesis states an ∞-groupoid is a space (less equivocally, an n-groupoid can be used as a homotopy n-type.)
horizontal composition
Given functors $f, g : C \to D, \, u, v : D \to E$, the horizontal composition is

$$* : \operatorname{Nat}(u, v) \times \operatorname{Nat}(f, g) \to \operatorname{Nat}(u \circ f, v \circ g)$$

given by $(\psi *\varphi)_x = \psi_{g(x)} \circ u(\varphi_x) = v(\varphi_x) \circ \psi_{f(x)}$ (the second equality is because $\psi$ is natural).

== I ==
idempotent
1. An endomorphism f is idempotent if $f \circ f = f$.
2. The idempotent completion of a category is a universal enlargement of a category so that the idempotents split. For example, the category of effective (pure) motives is defined as the idempotent completion of the category of correspondences.
identity
1. The identity morphism f of an object A is a morphism from A to A such that for any morphisms g with domain A and h with codomain A, $g\circ f=g$ and $f\circ h=h$.
2. The identity functor on a category C is a functor from C to C that sends objects and morphisms to themselves.
3. Given a functor F: C → D, the identity natural transformation from F to F is a natural transformation consisting of the identity morphisms of F(X) in D for the objects X in C.
image
The image of a morphism f: X → Y is the equalizer of $Y \rightrightarrows Y \sqcup_X Y$.
ind-limit
A colimit (or inductive limit) in $\mathbf{Fct}(C^{\text{op}}, \mathbf{Set})$.
inductive limit
Another name for colimit.
∞-category

[T]he theory of ∞-categories is a semantic interpretation of the formal language of category theory. This means that one can systematically make sense of any statement formulated in the language of category theory in the setting of ∞-categories.

— Denis-Charles Cisinski,
An ∞-category is obtained from a category by replacing the class/set of objects and morphisms by the spaces of objects and morphisms. Precisely, an ∞-category C is a simplicial set satisfying the following condition: for each 0 < i < n,
- every map of simplicial sets $f: \Lambda^n_i \to C$ extends to an n-simplex $f: \Delta^n \to C$
where Δ^{n} is the standard n-simplex and $\Lambda^n_i$ is obtained from Δ^{n} by removing the i-th face and the interior (see Kan fibration#Definitions). For example, the nerve of a category satisfies the condition and thus can be considered as an ∞-category.
(∞, n)-category
An (∞, n)-category is obtained from an ∞-category by replacing the space of morphisms by the (∞, n - 1)-category of morphisms.
∞-sheaf
Another term for a homotopy sheaf.
initial
1. An object A is initial if there is exactly one morphism from A to each object; e.g., empty set in Set.
2. An object A in an ∞-category C is initial if $\operatorname{Map}_C(A, B)$ is contractible for each object B in C.
injective
1. An object A in an abelian category is injective if the functor $\operatorname{Hom}(-, A)$ is exact. It is the dual of a projective object.
2. The term “injective limit” is another name for a direct limit.
interchange
The interchange law says

$$(\psi' \circ \varphi') * (\psi \circ \varphi) = (\psi' * \psi) \circ (\varphi' * \varphi)$$

where $\circ, *$ denote vertical composition and horizontal composition. Together with preservation of identities, the law is equivalent to say

$$* : \operatorname{Fct}(B, C) \times \operatorname{Fct}(A, B) \to \operatorname{Fct}(A, C)$$

is a functor.
internal Hom
Given a monoidal category (C, ⊗), the internal Hom is a functor $[-, -]: C^{\text{op}} \times C \to C$ such that $[Y, -]$ is the right adjoint to $- \otimes Y$ for each object Y in C. For example, the category of modules over a commutative ring R has the internal Hom given as $[M, N] = \operatorname{Hom}_R(M, N)$, the set of R-linear maps.
inverse
1. A morphism f is an inverse to a morphism g if $g\circ f$ is defined and is equal to the identity morphism on the codomain of g, and $f\circ g$ is defined and equal to the identity morphism on the domain of g. The inverse of g is unique and is denoted by g^{−1}. f is a left inverse to g if $f\circ g$ is defined and is equal to the identity morphism on the domain of g, and similarly for a right inverse.
2. An inverse limit is the limit of an inverse system.
Isbell
1. Isbell duality/Isbell conjugacy
2. Isbell completion.
3. Isbell envelop.
isomorphic
1. An object is isomorphic to another object if there is an isomorphism between them.
2. A category is isomorphic to another category if there is an isomorphism between them.
isomorphism
A morphism f is an isomorphism if there exists an inverse of f.

== K ==
Kan
1. A Kan complex is a fibrant object in the category of simplicial sets; i.e., the unique morphism from it to the final object is a fibration (Kan fibration). It is often taken as a model of an ∞-groupoid.
2. A Kan fibration between simplicial sets is a map having the right lifting property with respect to the horn inclusions $\Lambda^n_k \to \Delta^n$ for $n \ge 1$ and $0 \le k \le n$.
3. Consider the category of Kan complexes where each hom-set is a simplicoal set. The homotopy coherent nerve of it is an ∞-category denoted by Kan. In view of homotopy hypothesis, the latter is often viewed as an ∞-category of spaces.
Kan extension
1. Given a category C, the left Kan extension functor along a functor $f: I \to J$ is the left adjoint (if it exists) to $f^* = - \circ f: \operatorname{Fct}(J, C) \to \operatorname{Fct}(I, C)$ and is denoted by $f_!$. For any $\alpha: I \to C$, the functor $f_! \alpha: J \to C$ is called the left Kan extension of α along f. One can show:

$$(f_! \alpha)(j) = \varinjlim_{f(i) \to j} \alpha(i)$$

where the colimit runs over all objects $f(i) \to j$ in the comma category.
2. The right Kan extension functor is the right adjoint (if it exists) to $f^*$ and is denoted by $f_*$.
Ken Brown's lemma
Ken Brown's lemma gives a sufficient condition for a functor to preserve weak equivalences.
Kleisli category
Given a monad T, the Kleisli category of T is the full subcategory of the category of T-algebras (called Eilenberg–Moore category) that consists of free T-algebras.

== L ==
large
A large category is a category where all the morphisms form a class not a set. In other words, a category that is not small.
Lawvere
Lawvere's fixed point theorem. For now, see https://ncatlab.org/nlab/show/Lawvere%27s+fixed+point+theorem
lax-, oplax-, colax-
1. In 2-category and more generalized higher categories, the prefix lax- is added to particular categorical structures to represent up-to-not-necessarily-invertible comparison notion, and when the direction of the comparison is reversed, the prefix oplax- or the prefix colax- is added instead.
2. Especially, a lax functor is a generalisation of a pseudo-functor, in which the structural transformations associated to composition and identities are not required to be invertible.
length
An object in an abelian category is said to have finite length if it has a composition series. The maximum number of proper subobjects in any such composition series is called the length of A.
limit
1. The limit (or projective limit) of a functor $f: I^{\text{op}} \to \mathbf{Set}$ is

$$\varprojlim_{i \in I} f(i) = \{ (x_i|i) \in \prod_{i} f(i) \mid f(s)(x_j) = x_i \text{ for any } s: i \to j \}.$$

2. The limit $\varprojlim_{i \in I} f(i)$ of a functor $f: I^{\text{op}} \to C$ is an object, if any, in C that satisfies: for any object X in C, $\operatorname{Hom}(X, \varprojlim_{i \in I} f(i)) = \varprojlim_{i \in I} \operatorname{Hom}(X, f(i))$; i.e., it is an object representing the functor $X \mapsto \varprojlim_i \operatorname{Hom}(X, f(i)).$
3. The colimit (or inductive limit) $\varinjlim_{i \in I} f(i)$ is the dual of a limit; i.e., given a functor $f: I \to C$, it satisfies: for any X, $\operatorname{Hom}(\varinjlim f(i), X) = \varprojlim \operatorname{Hom}(f(i), X)$. Explicitly, to give $\varinjlim f(i) \to X$ is to give a family of morphisms $f(i) \to X$ such that for any $i \to j$, $f(i) \to X$ is $f(i) \to f(j) \to X$. Perhaps the simplest example of a colimit is a coequalizer. For another example, take f to be the identity functor on C and suppose $L = \varinjlim_{X \in C} f(X)$ exists; then the identity morphism on L corresponds to a compatible family of morphisms $\alpha_X: X \to L$ such that $\alpha_L$ is the identity. If $f: X \to L$ is any morphism, then $f = \alpha_L \circ f = \alpha_X$; i.e., L is a final object of C.
localization of a category
See localization of a category and localization of an ∞-category.

== M ==
Makkai
Makkai duality. For now, see https://ncatlab.org/nlab/show/Makkai+duality
Mittag-Leffler condition
An inverse system $\cdots \to X_2 \to X_1 \to X_0$ is said to satisfy the Mittag-Leffler condition if for each integer $n \ge 0$, there is an integer $m \ge n$ such that for each $l \ge m$, the images of $X_m \to X_n$ and $X_l \to X_n$ are the same.
modification
A modification is a morphism between natural transformations.
modular
modular category
monad
A monad in a category X is a monoid object in the monoidal category of endofunctors of X with the monoidal structure given by composition. For example, given a group G, define an endofunctor T on Set by $T(X) = G \times X$. Then define the multiplication μ on T as the natural transformation $\mu: T \circ T \to T$ given by

$$\mu_X: G \times (G \times X) \to G \times X, \,\, (g, (h, x)) \mapsto (gh, x)$$

and also define the identity map η in the analogous fashion. Then (T, μ, η) constitutes a monad in Set. More substantially, an adjunction between functors $F: X \rightleftarrows A : G$ determines a monad in X; namely, one takes $T = G \circ F$, the identity map η on T to be a unit of the adjunction and also defines μ using the adjunction.
monadic
1. An adjunction is said to be monadic if it comes from the monad that it determines by means of the Eilenberg–Moore category (the category of algebras for the monad).
2. A functor is said to be monadic if it is a constituent of a monadic adjunction.
monoidal category
A monoidal category, also called a tensor category, is a category C equipped with (1) a bifunctor $\otimes: C \times C \to C$, (2) an identity object and (3) natural isomorphisms that make ⊗ associative and the identity object an identity for ⊗, subject to certain coherence conditions.
monoid object
A monoid object in a monoidal category is an object together with the multiplication map and the identity map that satisfy the expected conditions like associativity. For example, a monoid object in Set is a usual monoid (unital semigroup) and a monoid object in R-mod is an associative algebra over a commutative ring R.
monomorphism
A morphism f is a monomorphism (also called monic) if $g=h$ whenever $f\circ g=f\circ h$; e.g., an injection in Set. In other words, f is the dual of an epimorphism.
multicategory
A multicategory is a generalization of a category in which a morphism is allowed to have more than one domain. It is the same thing as a colored operad.

== N ==
n-category

[T]he issue of comparing definitions of weak n-category is a slippery one, as it is hard to say what it even means for two such definitions to be equivalent. [...] It is widely held that the structure formed by weak n-categories and the functors, transformations, ... between them should be a weak (n + 1)-category; and if this is the case then the question is whether your weak (n + 1)-category of weak n-categories is equivalent to mine—but whose definition of weak (n + 1)-category are we using here... ?

— Tom Leinster, A survey of definitions of n-category
1. A strict n-category is defined inductively: a strict 0-category is a set and a strict n-category is a category whose Hom sets are strict (n-1)-categories. Precisely, a strict n-category is a category enriched over strict (n-1)-categories. For example, a strict 1-category is an ordinary category.
2. The notion of a weak n-category is obtained from the strict one by weakening the conditions like associativity of composition to hold only up to coherent isomorphisms in the weak sense.
3. One can define an ∞-category as a kind of a colim of n-categories. Conversely, if one has the notion of a (weak) ∞-category (say a quasi-category) in the beginning, then a weak n-category can be defined as a type of a truncated ∞-category.
natural
1. A natural transformation is, roughly, a map between functors. Precisely, given a pair of functors F, G from a category C to category D, a natural transformation φ from F to G is a set of morphisms in D

$$\{ \phi_x: F(x) \to G(x) \mid x \in \operatorname{Ob}(C) \}$$

satisfying the condition: for each morphism f: x → y in C, $\phi_y \circ F(f) = G(f) \circ \phi_x$. For example, writing $GL_n(R)$ for the group of invertible n-by-n matrices with coefficients in a commutative ring R, we can view $GL_n$ as a functor from the category CRing of commutative rings to the category Grp of groups. Similarly, $R \mapsto R^*$ is a functor from CRing to Grp. Then the determinant det is a natural transformation from $GL_n$ to -^{*}.
2. A natural isomorphism is a natural transformation that is an isomorphism (i.e., admits the inverse).
natural number
natural number object

The composition is encoded as a 2-simplex.

nerve
1. The nerve functor N is the functor from Cat to sSet given by $N(C)_n = \operatorname{Hom}_{\mathbf{Cat}}([n], C)$. For example, if $\varphi$ is a functor in $N(C)_2$ (called a 2-simplex), let $x_i = \varphi(i), \, 0 \le i \le 2$. Then $\varphi(0 \to 1)$ is a morphism $f: x_0 \to x_1$ in C and also $\varphi(1 \to 2) = g: x_1 \to x_2$ for some g in C. Since $0 \to 2$ is $0 \to 1$ followed by $1 \to 2$ and since $\varphi$ is a functor, $\varphi(0 \to 2) = g \circ f$. In other words, $\varphi$ encodes f, g and their compositions.
2. The homotopy coherent nerve of a simplicially enriched category is a generalization. For a 2-category, it is called the Duskin nerve of it.
normal
A monomorphism is normal if it is the kernel of some morphism, and an epimorphism is conormal if it is the cokernel of some morphism. A category is normal if every monomorphism is normal.

== O ==
object
1. An object is part of a data defining a category.
2. An [adjective] object in a category C is a contravariant functor (or presheaf) from some fixed category corresponding to the "adjective" to C. For example, a simplicial object in C is a contravariant functor from the simplicial category to C and a Γ-object is a pointed contravariant functor from Γ (roughly the pointed category of pointed finite sets) to C provided C is pointed.
op-fibration
A functor π:C → D is an op-fibration if, for each object x in C and each morphism g : π(x) → y in D, there is at least one π-coCartesian morphism f: x → y' in C such that π(f) = g. In other words, π is the dual of a Grothendieck fibration.
opposite
The opposite category of a category is obtained by reversing the arrows. For example, if a partially ordered set is viewed as a category, taking its opposite amounts to reversing the ordering.

== P ==
parallel morphism
Two morphisms f,g in a category $\mathcal C$ are parallel if they have the same domain and codomain, visualized by: $f,g : A \overset{f}{\underset{g}{\rightrightarrows}} B$.
perfect
Sometimes synonymous with "compact". See perfect complex.
pointed
A category (or ∞-category) is called pointed if it has a zero object.
polygraph
A polygraph is a generalization of a directed graph.
polynomial
A functor from the category of finite-dimensional vector spaces to itself is called a polynomial functor if, for each pair of vector spaces V, W, F: Hom(V, W) → Hom(F(V), F(W)) is a polynomial map between the vector spaces. A Schur functor is a basic example.
pre-abelian
A pre-abelian category is an additive category that has all kernels and cokernels.
preadditive
A category is preadditive if it is enriched over the monoidal category of abelian groups. More generally, it is R-linear if it is enriched over the monoidal category of R-modules, for R a commutative ring.
preorder
A preorder is a category in which, for each objects $a, b$, if there is a morphism $a \to b$, it is unique. (This definition coincides with the usual non-category-theory definition.)
presentable
1. Given a regular cardinal κ, a category is κ-presentable if it admits all small colimits and is κ-accessible. A category is presentable if it is κ-presentable for some regular cardinal κ (hence presentable for any larger cardinal). Note: Some authors call a presentable category a locally presentable category.
2. A presentable ∞-category.
presheaf
Another term for a contravariant functor: a functor from a category C^{op} to Set is a presheaf of sets on C and a functor from C^{op} to sSet is a presheaf of simplicial sets or simplicial presheaf, etc. A topology on C, if any, tells which presheaf is a sheaf (with respect to that topology).
product
1. The product of a family of objects X_{i} in a category C indexed by a set I is the projective limit $\varprojlim$ of the functor $I \to C, \, i \mapsto X_i$, where I is viewed as a discrete category. It is denoted by $\prod_i X_i$ and is the dual of the coproduct of the family.
2. The product of a family of categories C_{i}'s indexed by a set I is the category denoted by $\prod_i C_i$ whose class of objects is the product of the classes of objects of C_{i}'s and whose hom-sets are $\prod_i \operatorname{Hom}_{\operatorname{C_i}}(X_i, Y_i)$; the morphisms are composed component-wise. It is the dual of the disjoint union.
2. Given functors $f, g$, their product is defined pointwise: $(f \times g)(a, b) = (f(a), f(b))$ for pairs of objects and morphisms $a, b$.
profunctor
Given categories C and D, a profunctor (or a distributor) from C to D is a functor of the form $D^{\text{op}} \times C \to \mathbf{Set}$.
projective
1. An object A in an abelian category is projective if the functor $\operatorname{Hom}(A, -)$ is exact. It is the dual of an injective object.
2. The term “projective limit” is another name for an inverse limit.
PROP
A PROP is a symmetric strict monoidal category whose objects are natural numbers and whose tensor product addition of natural numbers.
pseudo-
In 2-category and more generalized higher categories, the prefix pseudo- is added to particular categorical structures to represent the up-to-isomorphism notions.
pseudoalgebra
A pseudoalgebra is a 2-category-version of an algebra for a monad (with a monad replaced by a 2-monad).
pseudo-abelian envelope
The pseudo-abelian envelope of an additive category is the smallest pseudo-abelian category containing the given category.
pseudo-tensor category
pseudo-tensor category.

== Q ==
Q
Q-category.
Quillen
Quillen’s theorem A provides a criterion for a functor to be a weak equivalence.
quasi-abelian
a quasi-abelian category.
quasitopos
a quasitopos.

== R ==
Reedy
1. A Reedy category. A prototypical example is the simplex category $\Delta$.
reflect
1. A functor is said to reflect identities if it has the property: if F(k) is an identity then k is an identity as well.
2. A functor is said to reflect isomorphisms if it has the property: F(k) is an isomorphism then k is an isomorphism as well.
regular
1. A regular monomorphism is an equalizer $A \to B$ of some pairs of morphisms $B \to C$.
2. A regular epimorphism is the dual of a regular monomorphism; i.e., a coequalizer.
2. A regular category.
representable
A set-valued contravariant functor F on a category C is said to be representable if it belongs to the essential image of the Yoneda embedding $C \to \mathbf{Fct}(C^{\text{op}}, \mathbf{Set})$; i.e., $F \simeq \operatorname{Hom}_C(-, Z)$ for some object Z. The object Z is said to be the representing object of F.
retraction

f is a retraction of g. g is a section of f.

A morphism is a retraction if it has a right inverse.
rig
A rig category is a category with two monoidal structures, one distributing over the other.
rigid
A rigid category.

== S ==
Schur
A Schur functor.
section
A morphism is a section if it has a left inverse. For example, the axiom of choice says that any surjective function admits a section.
Segal
1. Segal condition. For now, see https://ncatlab.org/nlab/show/Segal+condition
2. Segal spaces were certain simplicial spaces, introduced as models for (∞, 1)-categories.
3. Segal category, a model of an ∞-category.
semi-abelian
A semi-abelian category.
semisimple
An abelian category is semisimple if every short exact sequence splits. For example, a ring is semisimple if and only if the category of modules over it is semisimple.
Serre functor
Given a k-linear category C over a field k, a Serre functor $f: C \to C$ is an auto-equivalence such that $\operatorname{Hom}(A, B) \simeq \operatorname{Hom}(B,f(A))^*$ for any objects A, B.
setoid
A setoid is an object in the free exact completion of the category of sets. If the axiom of choice is valid, it is the same as a set.
sieve
In a category, a sieve on an object x is a set S of some morphisms with the target x such that, for each $f$ in $S$ and each morphism $g$ in the category, $f \circ g$ is in $S$ if the composition is defined.
simple object
A simple object in an abelian category is an object A that is not isomorphic to the zero object and whose every subobject is isomorphic to zero or to A. For example, a simple module is precisely a simple object in the category of (say left) modules.
simplex category
The simplex category Δ is the category where an object is a set [n] = { 0, 1, …, n }, n ≥ 0, totally ordered in the standard way and a morphism is an order-preserving function.
simplicial category
A category enriched over simplicial sets.
Simplicial localization
Simplicial localization is a method of localizing a category.
simplicial object
A simplicial object in a category C is roughly a sequence of objects $X_0, X_1, X_2, \dots$ in C that forms a simplicial set. In other words, it is a covariant or contravariant functor Δ → C. For example, a simplicial presheaf is a simplicial object in the category of presheaves.
Simpson
Simpson's semi-strictification conjecture (as this is a red link, for now, see ).
simplicial set
A simplicial set is a contravariant functor from Δ to Set, where Δ is the simplex category, a category whose objects are the sets [n] = { 0, 1, …, n } and whose morphisms are order-preserving functions. One writes $X_n = X([n])$ and an element of the set $X_n$ is called an n-simplex. For example, $\Delta^n = \operatorname{Hom}_{\Delta}(-, [n])$ is a simplicial set called the standard n-simplex. By Yoneda's lemma, $X_n \simeq \operatorname{Nat}(\Delta^n, X)$.
site
A category equipped with a Grothendieck topology.
skeletal
1. A category is skeletal if isomorphic objects are necessarily identical.
2. A (not unique) skeleton of a category is a full subcategory that is skeletal.
slice
Given a category C and an object A in it, the slice category C_{/A} of C over A is the category whose objects are all the morphisms in C with codomain A, whose morphisms are morphisms in C such that if f is a morphism from $p_X: X \to A$ to $p_Y: Y \to A$, then $p_Y \circ f = p_X$ in C and whose composition is that of C.
small
1. A small category is a category in which the class of all morphisms is a set (i.e., not a proper class); otherwise large. A category is locally small if the morphisms between every pair of objects A and B form a set. Some authors assume a foundation in which the collection of all classes forms a "conglomerate", in which case a quasicategory is a category whose objects and morphisms merely form a conglomerate. (NB: some authors use the term "quasicategory" with a different meaning.)
2. An object in a category is said to be small if it is κ-compact for some regular cardinal κ. The notion prominently appears in Quiilen's small object argument (cf. https://ncatlab.org/nlab/show/small+object+argument)
species
A (combinatorial) species is an endofunctor on the groupoid of finite sets with bijections. It is categorically equivalent to a symmetric sequence.
spherical
Spherical category.
stable
An ∞-category is stable if (1) it has a zero object, (2) every morphism in it admits a fiber and a cofiber and (3) a triangle in it is a fiber sequence if and only if it is a cofiber sequence.
strict
1. A morphism f in a category admitting finite limits and finite colimits is strict if the natural morphism $\operatorname{Coim}(f) \to \operatorname{Im}(f)$ is an isomorphism.
2. A strict epimorphism f is an eqimorphism such that for each pair of morphisms $g, h$ such that $f \circ g = f \circ h$, we have $f$ is the coequalizer of $g, h$.
3. A strict monomorphism is a morphism such that it is a strict epimorphism in the opposite category.
strict n-category
A strict 0-category is a set and for any integer n > 0, a strict n-category is a category enriched over strict (n-1)-categories. For example, a strict 1-category is an ordinary category. Note: the term "n-category" typically refers to "weak n-category"; not strict one.
strictification
A strictification is a process of replacing equalities holding weakly (i.e., up to coherent isomorphisms) by actual equalities.
string
String diagram
subcanonical
A topology on a category is subcanonical if every representable contravariant functor on C is a sheaf with respect to that topology. Generally speaking, some flat topology may fail to be subcanonical; but flat topologies appearing in practice tend to be subcanonical.
subcategory
A category A is a subcategory of a category B if there is an inclusion functor from A to B.
subobject
1. Given an object A in a category, a subobject of A is an equivalence class of monomorphisms to A; two monomorphisms f, g are considered equivalent if f factors through g and g factors through f.
2. A subobject classifier classifies subobjects. For example, for Set, the two-element set $\Omega = \{ 0, 1 \}$ serves as a subobject classifier since specifying a subset of a set amounts to partitioning the set into two parts. More precisely, each subset of a set $S$ is the fiber $\chi^{-1}(1)$ of some function $\chi : S \to \Omega$; that is, each set inclusion is classified in the sense it is obtained by pulling back the inclusion $\{ 1 \} \hookrightarrow \Omega$.
subquotient
A subquotient is a quotient of a subobject.
subterminal object
A subterminal object is an object X such that every object has at most one morphism into X.
surface
A surface diagram is a higher-dimensional generalization of a string diagram. For now, see https://ncatlab.org/toddtrimble/published/Surface+diagrams
symmetric monoidal category
A symmetric monoidal category is a monoidal category (i.e., a category with ⊗) that has maximally symmetric braiding.
symmetric sequence
A symmetric sequence is a sequence of objects with actions of symmetric groups. It is categorically equivalent to a (combinatorial) species.
syntactic category
syntactic category

== T ==
t-structure
A t-structure is an additional structure on a triangulated category (more generally stable ∞-category) that axiomatizes the notions of complexes whose cohomology concentrated in non-negative degrees or non-positive degrees.
Tannakian duality
The Tannakian duality states that, in an appropriate setup, to give a morphism $f: X \to Y$ is to give a pullback functor $f^*$ along it. In other words, the Hom set $\operatorname{Hom}(X, Y)$ can be identified with the functor category $\operatorname{Fct}(D(Y), D(X))$, perhaps in the derived sense, where $D(X)$ is the category associated to X (e.g., the derived category).
tensor category
Usually synonymous with monoidal category (though some authors distinguish between the two concepts.)
tensor triangulated category
A tensor triangulated category is a category that carries the structure of a symmetric monoidal category and that of a triangulated category in a compatible way.
tensor product
Given a monoidal category B, the tensor product of functors $F: C^{\text{op}} \to B$ and $G: C \to B$ is the coend:

$$F \otimes_C G = \int^{c \in C} F(c) \otimes G(c).$$

terminal
1. An object A is terminal (also called final) if there is exactly one morphism from each object to A; e.g., singletons in Set. It is the dual of an initial object.
2. An object A in an ∞-category C is terminal if $\operatorname{Map}_C(B, A)$ is contractible for every object B in C. See Quasi-category#Final objects and final maps.
Theta category
Joyal's theta category is an alternative to the simplex category, that can be also used to defined an ∞-category.
thick subcategory
A full subcategory of an abelian category is thick if it is closed under extensions.
thin
A thin category is a category where there is at most one morphism between any pair of objects.
tiny
A tiny object. For now, see https://ncatlab.org/nlab/show/tiny+object
topological
1. A topological concrete category.
2. A topological topos, a possible substitute for the category of topological spaces. See https://golem.ph.utexas.edu/category/2014/04/on_a_topological_topos.html
transfinite
A transfinite composition is a composition involving infinitely many morphisms. See direct limit and inverse limit
triangulated category
A triangulated category is a category where one can talk about distinguished triangles, generalization of exact sequences. An abelian category is a prototypical example of a triangulated category. A derived category is a triangulated category that is not necessary an abelian category.

== U ==
U-category
For a universe U, a U-category is a category in which each hom-set is an element of U (i.e., a category that is locally U-small).
universal
1. Given a functor $f: C \to D$ and an object X in D, a universal morphism from X to f is an initial object in the comma category $(X \downarrow f)$. (Its dual is also called a universal morphism.) For example, take f to be the forgetful functor $\mathbf{Vec}_k \to \mathbf{Set}$ and X a set. An initial object of $(X \downarrow f)$ is a function $j: X \to f(V_X)$. That it is initial means that if $k: X \to f(W)$ is another morphism, then there is a unique morphism from j to k, which consists of a linear map $V_X \to W$ that extends k via j; that is to say, $V_X$ is the free vector space generated by X.
2. Stated more explicitly, given f as above, a morphism $X \to f(u_X)$ in D is universal if and only if the natural map

$$\operatorname{Hom}_C(u_X, c) \to \operatorname{Hom}_D(X, f(c)), \, \alpha \mapsto (X \to f(u_x) \overset{f(\alpha)}\to f(c))$$

is bijective. In particular, if $\operatorname{Hom}_C(u_X, -) \simeq \operatorname{Hom}_D(X, f(-))$, then taking c to be u_{X} one gets a universal morphism by sending the identity morphism. In other words, having a universal morphism is equivalent to the representability of the functor $\operatorname{Hom}_D(X, f(-))$.
universe
A (Grothendieck) universe U is a set such that
1. If $x \in y \in U$, then $x \in U$,
2. For $x, y$ in $U$ (possibly the same), $\{ x, y \} \in U$,
3. For $x$ in $U$, the power set of $x$ is in $U$,
4. For each function $f : x \to U$ with $x \in U$, the union $\cup_{i \in x} f(i)$ is in $U$,
5. $\mathbb{N} \in U$.
A formulation of a functor category cannot usually be done inside the given universe U. Indeed, $\mathsf{Fct}(U, \{ 0, 1 \})$ amounts to the power set of U, which is not an element of U.

== V ==
Verdier localization
Verdier localization
vertical composition
Given natural transformations $\varphi : f \to g, \psi : g \to h$, the vertical composition $\psi \circ \varphi$ is the pointwise composition: $(\psi \circ \varphi)_x = \psi_x \circ \varphi_x$. For small categories, it is the same as the composition in the functor category.

== W ==
Waldhausen category
A Waldhausen category is, roughly, a category with families of cofibrations and weak equivalences.
wellpowered
A category is wellpowered if for each object there is only a set of pairwise non-isomorphic subobjects.

== Y ==
Yoneda
1.

Yoneda’s Lemma asserts ... in more evocative terms, a mathematical object X is best thought of in the context of a category surrounding it, and is determined by the network of relations it enjoys with all the objects of that category. Moreover, to understand X it might be more germane to deal directly with the functor representing it. This is reminiscent of Wittgenstein’s ’language game’; i.e., that the meaning of a word is—in essence—determined by, in fact is nothing more than, its relations to all the utterances in a language.

— Barry Mazur, Thinking about Grothendieck
The Yoneda lemma says: for each set-valued contravariant functor F on C and an object X in C, there is a natural bijection

$$F(X) \simeq \operatorname{Nat}(\operatorname{Hom}_C(-, X), F)$$

where Nat means the set of natural transformations. In particular, the functor

$$y: C \to \mathbf{Fct}(C^{\text{op}}, \mathbf{Set}), \, X \mapsto \operatorname{Hom}_C(-, X)$$

is fully faithful and is called the Yoneda embedding.
2. If $F: C \to D$ is a functor and y is the Yoneda embedding of C, then the Yoneda extension of F is the left Kan extension of F along y.

3. 2-Yoneda lemma is an extension of the Yoneda lemma to 2-categories.

== Z ==
zero
A zero object is an object that is both initial and terminal, such as a trivial group in Grp.
