= Formal criteria for adjoint functors =

Criteria in Category theory of Mathematics

In category theory, a branch of mathematics, the formal criteria for adjoint functors are criteria for the existence of a left or right adjoint of a given functor.

One criterion is the following, which first appeared in Peter J. Freyd's 1964 book Abelian Categories, an Introduction to the Theory of Functors:

Freyd's adjoint functor theorem—Let $G: \mathcal{B} \to \mathcal{A}$ be a functor between categories such that $\mathcal{B}$ is complete. Then the following are equivalent (for simplicity ignoring the set-theoretic issues):

1. G has a left adjoint.
2. $G$ preserves all limits, and the following solution set condition is satisfied: for each object x in $\mathcal{A}$, there exist a set I and an I-indexed family of morphisms $f_i : x \to G y_i$ such that each morphism $x \to Gy$ is of the form $G(y_i \to y) \circ f_i$ for some morphism $y_i \to y$.

Another criterion is:

Kan criterion for the existence of a left adjoint—Let $G: \mathcal{B} \to \mathcal{A}$ be a functor between categories. Then the following are equivalent.

1. G has a left adjoint.
2. G preserves limits and, for each object x in $\mathcal{A}$, the limit $\lim ({(x \downarrow G) \to \mathcal{B}})$ exists in $\mathcal{B}$.
3. The right Kan extension $G_! 1_{\mathcal{B}}$ of the identity functor $1_{\mathcal{B}}$ along G exists and is preserved by G.

Moreover, when this is the case then a left adjoint of G can be computed using the right Kan extension.

== See also ==
- Anafunctor

== Bibliography ==
- Mac Lane, Saunders (17 April 2013). Categories for the Working Mathematician. Springer Science & Business Media. ISBN 978-1-4757-4721-8.
- Borceux, Francis (1994). "Adjoint functors". Handbook of Categorical Algebra. pp. 96–131. doi:10.1017/CBO9780511525858.005. ISBN 978-0-521-44178-0.
- Leinster, Tom (2014). Basic Category Theory. arXiv:1612.09375. doi:10.1017/CBO9781107360068. ISBN 978-1-107-04424-1.
- Freyd, Peter (2003). "Abelian categories" (PDF). Reprints in Theory and Applications of Categories (3): 23–164.
- Kelly, Gregory Maxwell (1982). Basic concepts of enriched category theory (PDF). London Mathematical Society Lecture Note Series. Vol. 64. Cambridge University Press, Cambridge-New York. ISBN 0-521-28702-2. MR 0651714.
- Ulmer, Friedrich (1971). "The adjoint functor theorem and the Yoneda embedding". Illinois Journal of Mathematics. 15 (3). doi:10.1215/ijm/1256052605.
- Medvedev, M. Ya. (1975). "Semiadjoint functors and Kan extensions". Siberian Mathematical Journal. 15 (4): 674–676. doi:10.1007/BF00967444.
- Feferman, Solomon; Kreisel, G. (1969). "Set-Theoretical foundations of category theory". Reports of the Midwest Category Seminar III. Lecture Notes in Mathematics. Vol. 106. pp. 201–247. doi:10.1007/BFb0059148. ISBN 978-3-540-04625-7.
- Lane, Saunders Mac (1969). "Foundations for categories and sets". Category Theory, Homology Theory and their Applications II. Lecture Notes in Mathematics. Vol. 92. pp. 146–164. doi:10.1007/BFb0080770. ISBN 978-3-540-04611-0.
- Paré, Robert; Schumacher, Dietmar (1978). "Abstract families and the adjoint functor theorems, ch. IV The adjoint functor theorems". Indexed Categories and Their Applications. Lecture Notes in Mathematics. Vol. 661. pp. 1–125. doi:10.1007/BFb0061361. ISBN 978-3-540-08914-8.
