= Leinster group (disambiguation) =

Leinster group may refer to:

- Leinster group, in mathematics, a group-theoretic analogue of the perfect numbers
- Leinster group, a group of moraines and other remains of ancient glaciation of Mount Leinster in Ireland
- The Leinster group of Nickel deposits, mined near Leinster, Western Australia
- Several province-based groupings of Irish sport:
  - The Leinster Group of the 1925–26 National Football League (Ireland)
  - The Leinster group stage of the 2015 All-Ireland Senior Hurling Championship
  - The Leinster group stage of the 2016 All-Ireland Senior Ladies' Football Championship
