= Day convolution =

Convolution

In mathematics, specifically in category theory, Day convolution is an operation on functors that can be seen as a categorified version of function convolution. It was first introduced by Brian Day in 1970 in the general context of enriched functor categories.

Day convolution gives a symmetric monoidal structure on $\mathrm{Hom}(\mathbf{C},\mathbf{D})$ for two symmetric monoidal categories $\mathbf{C}, \mathbf{D}$.

Another related version is that Day convolution acts as a tensor product for a monoidal category structure on the category of functors $[\mathbf{C},V]$ over some monoidal category $V$.

== Definition ==
=== First version ===
Given $F,G \colon \mathbf{C} \to \mathbf{D}$ for two symmetric monoidal $\mathbf{C}, \mathbf{D}$, we define their Day convolution as follows.

It is the left kan extension along $\mathbf{C} \times \mathbf{C} \to^{\otimes} \mathbf{C}$ of the composition $\mathbf{C} \times \mathbf{C} \to^{F,G} \mathbf{D} \times \mathbf{D} \to^{\otimes} \mathbf{D}$

Thus evaluated on an object $O \in \mathbf{C}$, intuitively we get a colimit in $\mathbf{D}$ of $F(x) \otimes G(y)$ along approximations of $O \in \mathbf{C}$ as a pure tensor $x \otimes y$

Left kan extensions are computed via coends, which leads to the version below.

=== Enriched version ===
Let $(\mathbf{C}, \otimes_c)$ be a monoidal category enriched over a symmetric monoidal closed category $(V, \otimes)$. Given two functors $F,G \colon \mathbf{C} \to V$, we define their Day convolution as the following coend.

$$F \otimes_d G = \int^{x,y \in \mathbf{C}} \mathbf{C}(x \otimes_c y , -) \otimes Fx \otimes Gy$$

If $\otimes_c$ is symmetric, then $\otimes_d$ is also symmetric. We can show this defines an associative monoidal product:

$$\begin{aligned} & (F \otimes_d G) \otimes_d H \\[5pt]
\cong {} & \int^{c_1,c_2} (F \otimes_d G)c_1 \otimes Hc_2 \otimes \mathbf{C}(c_1 \otimes_c c_2, -) \\[5pt]
\cong {} & \int^{c_1,c_2} \left( \int^{c_3,c_4} Fc_3 \otimes Gc_4 \otimes \mathbf{C}(c_3 \otimes_c c_4 , c_1) \right) \otimes Hc_2 \otimes \mathbf{C}(c_1 \otimes_c c_2, -) \\[5pt]
\cong {} & \int^{c_1,c_2,c_3,c_4} Fc_3 \otimes Gc_4 \otimes Hc_2 \otimes \mathbf{C}(c_3 \otimes_c c_4 , c_1) \otimes \mathbf{C}(c_1 \otimes_c c_2, -) \\[5pt]
\cong {} & \int^{c_1,c_2,c_3,c_4} Fc_3 \otimes Gc_4 \otimes Hc_2 \otimes \mathbf{C}(c_3 \otimes_c c_4 \otimes_c c_2, -)  \\[5pt]
\cong {} & \int^{c_1,c_2,c_3,c_4} Fc_3 \otimes Gc_4 \otimes Hc_2 \otimes \mathbf{C}(c_2 \otimes_c c_4 , c_1) \otimes \mathbf{C}(c_3 \otimes_c c_1, -) \\[5pt]
\cong {} & \int^{c_1,c_3} Fc_3 \otimes (G \otimes_d H)c_1 \otimes \mathbf{C}(c_3 \otimes_c c_1, -) \\[5pt]
\cong {} & F \otimes_d (G \otimes_d H)\end{aligned}$$
