= Scone (disambiguation) =

A scone is a type of quick-bread, typically eaten with cream then jam.

Scone may also refer to:

== People ==
- Barbara Young, Baroness Young of Old Scone (born 1948), Labour member of the House of Lords
- Robert of Scone (died 1159), 12th century bishop of Cell Rígmonaid (or Kilrymont, now St Andrews)

== Places and related meanings ==
=== Australia ===
- Scone, New South Wales, Australia (named after the Scottish burgh by emigrants)
  - Scone Grammar School, Australian independent Anglican school
  - Scone High School, Australian government high school
  - Scone Horse Festival, celebration of Scone's cultural links to equines
  - Scone railway station, New South Wales
  - Scone Thoroughbreds, country rugby league team
  - The Scone Advocate, Australian local newspaper

=== Scotland ===
- Scone, Perth and Kinross, a village

== Other uses ==
- Scone (category theory), a special kind of comma category

== See also ==
- Drop-scone, British word for a small pancake
- Frybread, called "scones" in Utah and southern Idaho
