= Codensity monad =

In mathematics, especially in category theory, the codensity monad is a fundamental construction associating a monad to a wide class of functors.

== Definition ==
The codensity monad of a functor $G: D \to C$ is defined to be the right Kan extension of $G$ along itself, provided that this Kan extension exists. Thus, by definition it is in particular a functor
$$T^G : C \to C.$$
The monad structure on $T^G$ stems from the universal property of the right Kan extension.

The codensity monad exists whenever $D$ is a small category (has only a set, as opposed to a proper class, of morphisms) and $C$ possesses all (small, i.e., set-indexed) limits. It also exists whenever $G$ has a left adjoint.

By the general formula computing right Kan extensions in terms of ends, the codensity monad is given by the following formula:
$$T^G(c) = \int_{d \in D} G(d)^{C(c, G(d))},$$
where $C(c, G(d))$ denotes the set of morphisms in $C$ between the indicated objects and the integral denotes the end. The codensity monad therefore amounts to considering maps from $c$ to an object in the image of $G,$ and maps from the set of such morphisms to $G(d),$ compatible for all the possible $d.$ Thus, as is noted by Avery, codensity monads share some kinship with the concept of integration and double dualization.

== Examples ==
=== Codensity monads of right adjoints ===
If the functor $G$ admits a left adjoint $F,$ the codensity monad is given by the composite $G \circ F,$ together with the standard unit and multiplication maps.

=== Concrete examples for functors not admitting a left adjoint ===
In several interesting cases, the functor $G$ is an inclusion of a full subcategory not admitting a left adjoint. For example, the codensity monad of the inclusion of FinSet into Set is the ultrafilter monad associating to any set $M$ the set of ultrafilters on $M.$ This was proven by Kennison and Gildenhuys, though without using the term "codensity". In this formulation, the statement is reviewed by Leinster.

A related example is discussed by Leinster: the codensity monad of the inclusion of finite-dimensional vector spaces (over a fixed field $k$) into all vector spaces is the double dualization monad given by sending a vector space $V$ to its double dual
$$V^{**} = \operatorname{Hom}(\operatorname{Hom}(V, k), k).$$

Thus, in this example, the end formula mentioned above simplifies to considering (in the notation above) only one object $d,$ namely a one-dimensional vector space, as opposed to considering all objects in $D.$ Adámek and Sousa show that, in a number of situations, the codensity monad of the inclusion
$$D := C^{fp} \subseteq C$$
of finitely presented objects (also known as compact objects) is a double dualization monad with respect to a sufficiently nice cogenerating object. This recovers both the inclusion of finite sets in sets (where a cogenerator is the set of two elements), and also the inclusion of finite-dimensional vector spaces in vector spaces (where the cogenerator is the ground field).

Sipoş showed that the algebras over the codensity monad of the inclusion of finite sets (regarded as discrete topological spaces) into topological spaces are equivalent to Stone spaces. Avery shows that the Giry monad arises as the codensity monad of natural forgetful functors between certain categories of convex vector spaces to measurable spaces.

== Relation to Isbell duality ==
Di Liberti shows that the codensity monad is closely related to Isbell duality: for a given small category $C,$ Isbell duality refers to the adjunction
$$\mathcal O : Set^{C^{op}} \rightleftarrows (Set^C)^{op} : Spec$$
between the category of presheaves on $C$ (that is, functors from the opposite category of $C$ to sets) and the opposite category of copresheaves on $C.$ The monad
$$Spec \circ \mathcal O$$
induced by this adjunction is shown to be the codensity monad of the Yoneda embedding
$$y: C \to Set^{C^{op}}.$$
Conversely, the codensity monad of a full small dense subcategory $K$ in a cocomplete category $C$ is shown to be induced by Isbell duality.

== See also ==
- Monadic functor – Operation in algebra and mathematics
