= Peter J. Freyd =

American mathematician (born 1936)

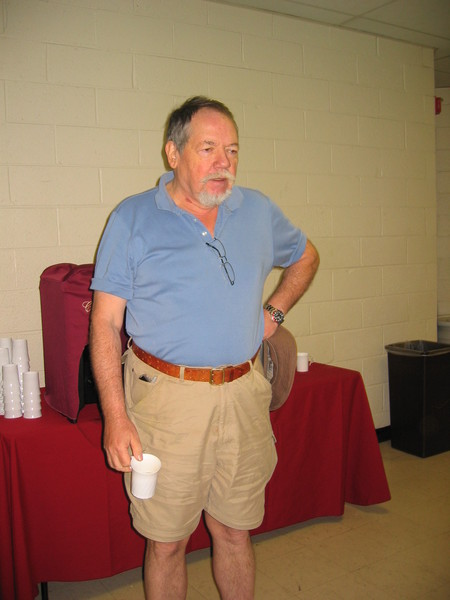
- Freyd in 2008
- Born: February 5, 1936 (age 90); Evanston, Illinois, U.S.
- Education: Brown University (BA); Princeton University (PhD)
- Known for: Allegory; Freyd cover Freyd's adjoint functor theorem Freyd–Mitchell theorem HOMFLY polynomial
- Scientific career
- Fields: Category theory
- Workplaces: University of Pennsylvania
- Doctoral advisors: Norman Steenrod; David Buchsbaum
- Doctoral students: Marta Bunge; Murray Adelman; Orville Kean; Preston Kohn; Douglas Howe; David E. Joyce; David N. Yetter; Stacey Finkelstein

Peter John Freyd (/fraɪd/; born February 5, 1936) is an American mathematician, a professor at the University of Pennsylvania, known for work in category theory and for founding the False Memory Syndrome Foundation.

== Mathematics ==
Freyd obtained his Ph.D. from Princeton University in 1960; his dissertation, on Functor Theory, was written under the supervision of Norman Steenrod and David Buchsbaum.

Freyd is best known for his adjoint functor theorem. He was the author of the foundational book Abelian Categories: An Introduction to the Theory of Functors (1964). This work culminates in a proof of the Freyd–Mitchell embedding theorem.

In addition, Freyd's name is associated with the HOMFLYPT polynomial of knot theory, and he and Andre Scedrov originated the concept of (mathematical) allegories.

In 2012, he became a fellow of the American Mathematical Society.

== Publications ==
- Peter Freyd (1964). Abelian Categories: An Introduction to the Theory of Functors. Harper and Row. Reprinted with a forward as "Abelian Categories". Reprints in Theory and Applications of Categories. 3: 23–164. 2003.
- Peter J. Freyd and Andre Scedrov: Categories, Allegories. North-Holland (1999). ISBN 0-444-70368-3.
- Freyd Peter J (1999). "Path Integrals, Bayesian Vision, and Is Gaussian Quadrature Really Good?". Electron. Notes Theor. Comput. Sci. 29: 79. doi:10.1016/S1571-0661(05)80308-1.
- Freyd Peter J.; O'Hearn Peter W.; Power A. John; Takeyama Makoto; Street R.; Tennent Robert D. (1999). "Bireflectivity". Theor. Comput. Sci. 228 (1–2): 49–76. doi:10.1016/S0304-3975(98)00354-5.
