= Regular category =

Mathematical category with finite limits and coequalizers

In category theory, a regular category is a category with finite limits and coequalizers of all pairs of morphisms called kernel pairs, satisfying certain exactness conditions. In that way, regular categories recapture many properties of abelian categories, like the existence of images, without requiring additivity. At the same time, regular categories provide a foundation for the study of a fragment of first-order logic, known as regular logic.

== Definition ==
A category C is called regular if it satisfies the following three properties:

- C is finitely complete.
- If f : X → Y is a morphism in C, and

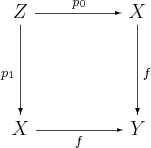

is a pullback, then the coequalizer of p_{0}, p_{1} exists. The pair (p_{0}, p_{1}) is called the kernel pair of f. Being a pullback, the kernel pair is unique up to a unique isomorphism.

- If f : X → Y is a morphism in C, and

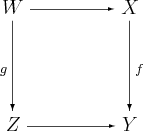

is a pullback, and if f is a regular epimorphism, then g is a regular epimorphism as well.

== Examples ==
Examples of regular categories include:

- Set, the category of sets and functions between the sets
- More generally, every elementary topos
- Grp, the category of groups and group homomorphisms
- The category of rings and ring homomorphisms
- More generally, the category of models of any variety
- Every bounded meet-semilattice, with morphisms given by the order relation
- Every abelian category

The following categories are not regular:

- Top, the category of topological spaces and continuous functions
- Cat, the category of small categories and functors

== Epi-mono factorization ==
In a regular category, the regular epimorphisms and the monomorphisms form a factorization system. Every morphism f:X→Y can be factorized into a regular epimorphism e:X→E followed by a monomorphism m:E→Y, so that f=me. The factorization is unique in the sense that if e':X→E' is another regular epimorphism and m':E'→Y is another monomorphism such that f=m'e', then there exists an isomorphism h:E→E' such that he=e' and m'h=m. The monomorphism m is called the image of f.

== Exact sequences and regular functors ==
In a regular category, a diagram of the form $R\rightrightarrows X\to Y$ is said to be an exact sequence if it is both a coequalizer and a kernel pair. The terminology is a generalization of exact sequences in homological algebra: in an abelian category, a diagram

$$R\;\overset r{\underset s\rightrightarrows}\; X\xrightarrow{f} Y$$

is exact in this sense if and only if $0\to R\xrightarrow{(r,s)}X\oplus X\xrightarrow{(f,-f)} Y\to 0$ is a short exact sequence in the usual sense.

A functor between regular categories is called regular, if it preserves finite limits and coequalizers of kernel pairs. A functor is regular if and only if it preserves finite limits and exact sequences. For this reason, regular functors are sometimes called exact functors. Functors that preserve finite limits are often said to be left exact.

== Regular logic and regular categories ==
Regular logic is the fragment of first-order logic that can express statements of the form

$\forall x (\phi (x) \to \psi (x))$,

where $\phi$ and $\psi$ are regular formulae i.e. formulae built up from atomic formulae, the truth constant, binary meets (conjunction) and existential quantification. Such formulae can be interpreted in a regular category, and the interpretation is a model of a sequent $\forall x (\phi (x) \to \psi (x))$, if the interpretation of $\phi$ factors through the interpretation of $\psi$. This gives for each theory (set of sequents) T and for each regular category C a category Mod(T,C) of models of T in C. This construction gives a functor Mod(T,-):RegCat→Cat from the category RegCat of small regular categories and regular functors to small categories. It is an important result that for each theory T there is a regular category R(T), such that for each regular category C there is an equivalence

$\mathbf{Mod}(T,C)\cong \mathbf{RegCat}(R(T),C)$,

which is natural in C. Here, R(T) is called the classifying category of the regular theory T. Up to equivalence any small regular category arises in this way as the classifying category of some regular theory.

== Exact (effective) categories ==
The theory of equivalence relations is a regular theory. An equivalence relation on an object $X$ of a regular category is a monomorphism into $X \times X$ that satisfies the interpretations of the conditions for reflexivity, symmetry and transitivity.

Every kernel pair $p_0, p_1: R \rightarrow X$ defines an equivalence relation $R \rightarrow X \times X$. Conversely, an equivalence relation is said to be effective if it arises as a kernel pair. An equivalence relation is effective if and only if it has a coequalizer and it is the kernel pair of this.

A regular category is said to be exact, or exact in the sense of Barr, or effective regular, if every equivalence relation is effective. (Note that the term "exact category" is also used differently, for the exact categories in the sense of Quillen.)

=== Examples of exact categories ===
- The category of sets is exact in this sense, and so is any (elementary) topos. Every equivalence relation has a coequalizer, which is found by taking equivalence classes.
- Every abelian category is exact.
- Every category that is monadic over the category of sets is exact.
- The category of Stone spaces is regular, but not exact.

== See also ==
- Allegory (category theory)
- Coherent category
- Topos
- Exact completion
