= Extranatural transformation =

Generalization of natural transformations

In mathematics, specifically in category theory, an extranatural transformation is a generalization of the notion of natural transformation.

== Definition ==
Let $F:A\times B^\mathrm{op}\times B\rightarrow D$ and $G:A\times C^\mathrm{op}\times C\rightarrow D$ be two functors of categories. A family $\eta (a,b,c):F(a,b,b)\rightarrow G(a,c,c)$ is said to be natural in a and extranatural in b and c if the following holds:

- $\eta(-,b,c)$ is a natural transformation (in the usual sense).
- (extranaturality in b) $\forall (g:b\rightarrow b^\prime)\in \mathrm{Mor}\, B$, $\forall a\in A$, $\forall c\in C$ the following diagram commutes

$$\begin{matrix}
F(a,b',b) & \xrightarrow{F(1,1,g)} & F(a,b',b') \\
_{F(1,g,1)}\downarrow\qquad & & _{\eta(a,b',c)}\downarrow\qquad \\
F(a,b,b) & \xrightarrow{\eta(a,b,c)} & G(a,c,c)
\end{matrix}$$

- (extranaturality in c) $\forall (h:c\rightarrow c^\prime)\in \mathrm{Mor}\, C$, $\forall a\in A$, $\forall b\in B$ the following diagram commutes

$$\begin{matrix}
F(a,b,b) & \xrightarrow{\eta(a,b,c')} & G(a,c',c') \\
_{\eta(a,b,c)}\downarrow\qquad & & _{G(1,h,1)}\downarrow\qquad \\
G(a,c,c) & \xrightarrow{G(1,1,h)} & G(a,c,c')
\end{matrix}$$

== Properties ==
Extranatural transformations can be used to define wedges and thereby ends (dually co-wedges and co-ends), by setting $F$ (dually $G$) constant.

Extranatural transformations can be defined in terms of dinatural transformations, of which they are a special case.

== See also ==
- Dinatural transformation
