= Simplicial presheaf =

In mathematics, more specifically in homotopy theory, a simplicial presheaf is a presheaf on a site (e.g., the category of topological spaces) taking values in simplicial sets (i.e., a contravariant functor from the site to the category of simplicial sets). Equivalently, a simplicial presheaf is a simplicial object in the category of presheaves on a site. The notion was introduced by A. Joyal in the 1970s. Similarly, a simplicial sheaf on a site is a simplicial object in the category of sheaves on the site.

== Examples ==
Example: Consider the étale site of a scheme S. Each U in the site represents the presheaf $\operatorname{Hom}(-, U)$. Thus, a simplicial scheme, a simplicial object in the site, represents a simplicial presheaf (in fact, often a simplicial sheaf).

Example: Let G be a presheaf of groupoids. Then taking nerves section-wise, one obtains a simplicial presheaf $BG$. For example, one might set $B\operatorname{GL} = \varinjlim B\operatorname{GL_n}$. These types of examples appear in K-theory.

If $f: X \to Y$ is a local weak equivalence of simplicial presheaves, then the induced map $\mathbb{Z} f: \mathbb{Z} X \to \mathbb{Z} Y$ is also a local weak equivalence.

== Homotopy sheaves of a simplicial presheaf ==
Let F be a simplicial presheaf on a site. The homotopy sheaves $\pi_* F$ of F are defined as follows. For any $f:X \to Y$ in the site and a 0-simplex s in F(X), set $(\pi_0^\text{pr} F)(X) = \pi_0 (F(X))$ and $(\pi_i^\text{pr} (F, s))(f) = \pi_i (F(Y), f^*(s))$. We then set $\pi_i F$ to be the sheaf associated with the pre-sheaf $\pi_i^\text{pr} F$.

== Model structures ==
The category of simplicial presheaves on a site admits several different model structures.

Some of them are obtained by viewing simplicial presheaves as functors

$$S^{op} \to \Delta^{op} Sets$$

The category of such functors is endowed with (at least) three model structures, namely the projective, the Reedy, and the injective model structure. The weak equivalences / fibrations in the first are maps

$$\mathcal F \to \mathcal G$$

such that

$$\mathcal F(U) \to \mathcal G(U)$$

is a weak equivalence / fibration of simplicial sets, for all U in the site S. The injective model structure is similar, but with weak equivalences and cofibrations instead.

== Stack ==
A simplicial presheaf F on a site is called a stack if, for any X and any hypercovering H →X, the canonical map

$$F(X) \to \operatorname{holim} F(H_n)$$

is a weak equivalence as simplicial sets, where the right is the homotopy limit of

$$[n] = \{ 0, 1, \dots, n \} \mapsto F(H_n)$$.

Any sheaf F on the site can be considered as a stack by viewing $F(X)$ as a constant simplicial set; this way, the category of sheaves on the site is included as a subcategory to the homotopy category of simplicial presheaves on the site. The inclusion functor has a left adjoint and that is exactly $F \mapsto \pi_0 F$.

If A is a sheaf of abelian group (on the same site), then we define $K(A, 1)$ by doing classifying space construction levelwise (the notion comes from the obstruction theory) and set $K(A, i) = K(K(A, i-1), 1)$. One can show (by induction): for any X in the site,

$$\operatorname{H}^i(X; A) = [X, K(A, i)]$$

where the left denotes a sheaf cohomology and the right the homotopy class of maps.

== See also ==
- cubical set
- N-group (category theory)
