= T-structure =

Concept in homological algebra

In the branch of mathematics called homological algebra, a t-structure is a way to axiomatize the properties of an abelian subcategory of a derived category. A t-structure on $\mathcal{D}$ consists of two subcategories $(\mathcal{D}^{\le 0}, \mathcal{D}^{\ge 0})$ of a triangulated category or stable infinity category which abstract the idea of complexes whose cohomology vanishes in positive, respectively negative, degrees. There can be many distinct t-structures on the same category, and the interplay between these structures has implications for algebra and geometry. The notion of a t-structure arose in the work of Beilinson, Bernstein, Deligne, and Gabber on perverse sheaves.

== Definition ==
Fix a triangulated category $\mathcal{D}$ with translation functor $[1]$. A t-structure on $\mathcal{D}$ is a pair $(\mathcal{D}^{\le 0}, \mathcal{D}^{\ge 0})$ of full subcategories, each of which is stable under isomorphism, which satisfy the following three axioms.

1. If X is an object of $\mathcal{D}^{\le 0}$ and Y is an object of $\mathcal{D}^{\ge 0}$, then $\operatorname{Hom}_{\mathcal{D}}(X, Y[-1]) = 0.$
2. If X is an object of $\mathcal{D}^{\le 0}$, then X[1] is also an object of $\mathcal{D}^{\le 0}$. Similarly, if Y is an object of $\mathcal{D}^{\ge 0}$, then Y[-1] is also an object of $\mathcal{D}^{\ge 0}$.
3. If A is an object of $\mathcal{D}$, then there exists a distinguished triangle $X \to A \to Y \to X[1]$ such that X is an object of $\mathcal{D}^{\le 0}$ and Y[1] is an object of $\mathcal{D}^{\ge 0}$.

It can be shown that the subcategories $\mathcal{D}^{\le 0}$ and $\mathcal{D}^{\ge 0}$ are closed under extensions in $\mathcal{D}$. In particular, they are stable under finite direct sums.

Suppose that $(\mathcal{D}^{\le 0}, \mathcal{D}^{\ge 0})$ is a t-structure on $\mathcal{D}$. In this case, for any integer n, we define $\mathcal{D}^{\le n}$ to be the full subcategory of $\mathcal{D}$ whose objects have the form $X[-n]$, where $X$ is an object of $\mathcal{D}^{\le 0}$. Similarly, $\mathcal{D}^{\ge n}$ is the full subcategory of objects $Y[-n]$, where $Y$ is an object of $\mathcal{D}^{\ge 0}$. More briefly, we define

$$\begin{align}
\mathcal{D}^{\le n} &= \mathcal{D}^{\le 0}[-n], \\
\mathcal{D}^{\ge n} &= \mathcal{D}^{\ge 0}[-n].
\end{align}$$

With this notation, the axioms above may be rewritten as:

1. If X is an object of $\mathcal{D}^{\le 0}$ and Y is an object of $\mathcal{D}^{\ge 1}$, then $\operatorname{Hom}_{\mathcal{D}}(X, Y) = 0.$
2. $\mathcal{D}^{\le 0} \subseteq \mathcal{D}^{\le 1}$ and $\mathcal{D}^{\ge 0} \supseteq \mathcal{D}^{\ge 1}$.
3. If A is an object of $\mathcal{D}$, then there exists a distinguished triangle $X \to A \to Y \to X[1]$ such that X is an object of $\mathcal{D}^{\le 0}$ and Y is an object of $\mathcal{D}^{\ge 1}$.

The heart or core of the t-structure is the full subcategory $\mathcal{D}^\heartsuit$ consisting of objects contained in both $\mathcal{D}^{\le 0}$ and $\mathcal{D}^{\ge 0}$, that is,

$$\mathcal{D}^\heartsuit = \mathcal{D}^{\le 0} \cap \mathcal{D}^{\ge 0}.$$

The heart of a t-structure is an abelian category (whereas a triangulated category is additive but almost never abelian), and it is stable under extensions.

A triangulated category with a choice of t-structure is sometimes called a t-category.

=== Variations ===
It is clear that, to define a t-structure, it suffices to fix integers m and n and specify $\mathcal{D}^{\le m}$ and $\mathcal{D}^{\ge n}$. Some authors define a t-structure to be the pair $(\mathcal{D}^{\le 0}, \mathcal{D}^{\ge 1})$.

The two subcategories $\mathcal{D}^{\le 0}$ and $\mathcal{D}^{\ge 1}$ determine each other. An object X is in $\mathcal{D}^{\le 0}$ if and only if $\operatorname{Hom}(X, Y) = 0$ for all objects Y in $\mathcal{D}^{\ge 1}$, and vice versa. That is, $(\mathcal{D}^{\le 0}, \mathcal{D}^{\ge 1})$ are left and right orthogonal complements of each other. Consequently, it is enough to specify only one of $\mathcal{D}^{\le 0}$ and $\mathcal{D}^{\ge 1}$. Moreover, because these subcategories are full by definition, it is enough to specify their objects.

The above notation is adapted to the study of cohomology. When the goal is to study homology, slightly different notation is used. A homological t-structure on $\mathcal{D}$ is a pair $(\mathcal{D}_{\ge 0}, \mathcal{D}_{\le 0})$ such that, if we define

$$(\mathcal{D}^{\le 0}, \mathcal{D}^{\ge 0}) = (\mathcal{D}_{\ge 0}, \mathcal{D}_{\le 0}),$$

then $(\mathcal{D}^{\leq 0}, \mathcal{D}^{\geq 0})$ is a (cohomological) t-structure on $\mathcal{D}$. That is, the definition is the same except that upper indices are converted to lower indices and the roles of $\ge$ and $\le$ are swapped. If we define

$$\begin{align}
\mathcal{D}_{\ge n} &= \mathcal{D}_{\ge 0}[n], \\
\mathcal{D}_{\le n} &= \mathcal{D}_{\le 0}[n],
\end{align}$$

then the axioms for a homological t-structure may be written explicitly as

1. If X is an object of $\mathcal{D}_{\ge 0}$ and Y is an object of $\mathcal{D}_{\le -1}$, then $\operatorname{Hom}_{\mathcal{D}}(X, Y) = 0.$
2. $\mathcal{D}_{\ge 1} \subseteq \mathcal{D}_{\ge 0}$ and $\mathcal{D}_{\le 1} \supseteq \mathcal{D}_{\le 0}$.
3. If A is an object of $\mathcal{D}$, then there exists a distinguished triangle $X \to A \to Y \to X[1]$ such that X is an object of $\mathcal{D}_{\ge 0}$ and Y is an object of $\mathcal{D}_{\le -1}$.

== Examples ==
=== The natural t-structure ===
The most fundamental example of a t-structure is the natural t-structure on a derived category. Let $\mathcal{A}$ be an abelian category, and let $D(\mathcal{A})$ be its derived category. Then the natural t-structure is defined by the pair of subcategories

$$\begin{align}
D(\mathcal{A})^{\le 0} &= \{X \colon \forall i > 0,\ H^i(X) = 0\}, \\
D(\mathcal{A})^{\ge 0} &= \{X \colon \forall i < 0,\ H^i(X) = 0\}.
\end{align}$$

It follows immediately that

$$\begin{align}
D(\mathcal{A})^{\le n} &= \{X \colon \forall i > n,\ H^i(X) = 0\}, \\
D(\mathcal{A})^{\ge n} &= \{X \colon \forall i < n,\ H^i(X) = 0\}, \\
D(\mathcal{A})^\heartsuit &= \{X \colon \forall i \neq 0,\ H^i(X) = 0\} \cong \mathcal{A}.
\end{align}$$

In this case, the third axiom for a t-structure, the existence of a certain distinguished triangle, can be made explicit as follows. Suppose that $A^\bullet$ is a cochain complex with values in $\mathcal{A}$. Define

$$\begin{align}
\tau^{\le 0}A^\bullet &= (\cdots \to A^{-2} \to A^{-1} \to \ker d^0 \to 0 \to 0 \to \cdots), \\
\tau^{\ge 1}A^\bullet &= (\cdots \to 0 \to 0 \to A^0 / \ker d^0 \to A^1 \to A^2 \to \cdots).
\end{align}$$

It is clear that $\tau^{\ge 1}A^\bullet = A^\bullet / \tau^{\le 0}A^\bullet$ and that there is a short exact sequence of complexes

$$0 \to \tau^{\le 0} A^\bullet \to A^\bullet \to \tau^{\ge 1} A^\bullet \to 0.$$

This exact sequence furnishes the required distinguished triangle.

This example can be generalized to exact categories (in the sense of Quillen). There are also similar t-structures for the bounded, bounded above, and bounded below derived categories. If $\mathcal{C}$ is an abelian subcategory of $\mathcal{A}$, then the full subcategory $D_{\mathcal{C}}(\mathcal{A})$ of $D(\mathcal{A})$ consisting of those complexes whose cohomology is in $\mathcal{C}$ has a similar t-structure whose heart is $\mathcal{C}$.

=== Perverse sheaves ===
The category of perverse sheaves is, by definition, the core of the so-called perverse t-structure on the derived category of the category of sheaves on a complex analytic space X or (working with l-adic sheaves) an algebraic variety over a finite field. As was explained above, the heart of the standard t-structure simply contains ordinary sheaves, regarded as complexes concentrated in degree 0. For example, the category of perverse sheaves on a (possibly singular) algebraic curve X (or analogously a possibly singular surface) is designed so that it contains, in particular, objects of the form

$$i_* F_Z, j_* F_U[1]$$

where $i: Z \to X$ is the inclusion of a point, $F_Z$ is an ordinary sheaf, $U$ is a smooth open subscheme and $F_U$ is a locally constant sheaf on U. Note the presence of the shift according to the dimension of Z and U respectively. This shift causes the category of perverse sheaves to be well-behaved on singular spaces. The simple objects in this category are the intersection cohomology sheaves of subvarieties with coefficients in an irreducible local system. This t-structure was introduced by Beilinson, Bernstein and Deligne. It was shown by Beilinson that the derived category of the heart $D^b(Perv(X))$ is in fact equivalent to the original derived category of sheaves. This is an example of the general fact that a triangulated category may be endowed with several distinct t-structures.

=== Graded modules ===
A non-standard example of a t-structure on the derived category of (graded) modules over a graded ring has the property that its heart consists of complexes

$$\dots \to P^n \to P^{n+1} \to \dots$$

where $P^n$ is a module generated by its (graded) degree n. This t-structure called geometric t-structure plays a prominent role in Koszul duality.

=== Spectra ===
The category of spectra is endowed with a t-structure generated, in the sense above, by a single object, namely the sphere spectrum. The category $Sp^{\le 0}$ is the category of connective spectra, i.e., those whose negative homotopy groups vanish. (In areas related to homotopy theory, it is common to use homological conventions, as opposed to cohomological ones, so in this case it is common to replace "$\le$" (superscript) by "$\ge$" (subscript). Using this convention, the category of connective spectra is denoted as $Sp_{\ge 0}$.)

=== Motives ===
A conjectural example in the theory of motives is the so-called motivic t-structure. Its (conjectural) existence is closely related to certain standard conjectures on algebraic cycles and vanishing conjectures, such as the Beilinson-Soulé conjecture.

== Truncation functors ==
In the above example of the natural t-structure on the derived category of an abelian category, the distinguished triangle guaranteed by the third axiom was constructed by truncation. As operations on the category of complexes, the truncations $\tau_{\le 0}A^\bullet$ and $\tau_{\ge 1} A^\bullet$ are functorial, and the resulting short exact sequence of complexes is natural in $A^\bullet$. Using this, it can be shown that there are truncation functors on the derived category and that they induce a natural distinguished triangle.

In fact, this is an example of a general phenomenon. While the axioms for a t-structure do not assume the existence of truncation functors, such functors can always be constructed and are essentially unique. Suppose that $\mathcal{D}$ is a triangulated category and that $(\mathcal{D}^{\le 0}, \mathcal{D}^{\ge 0})$ is a t-structure. The precise statement is that the inclusion functors

$$\begin{align}
\iota^{\le n} \colon &\mathcal{D}^{\le n} \to \mathcal{D}, \\
\iota^{\ge n} \colon &\mathcal{D}^{\ge n} \to \mathcal{D}
\end{align}$$

admit adjoints. These are functors

$$\begin{align}
\tau^{\le n} \colon &\mathcal{D} \to \mathcal{D}^{\le n}, \\
\tau^{\ge n} \colon &\mathcal{D} \to \mathcal{D}^{\ge n}
\end{align}$$

such that

$$\begin{align}
\iota^{\le n} \dashv \tau^{\le n}, \\
\tau^{\ge n} \dashv \iota^{\ge n}.
\end{align}$$

Moreover, for any object $A$ of $\mathcal{D}$, there exists a unique

$$d \in \operatorname{Hom}^1(\tau^{\ge 1} A, \tau^{\le 0} A)$$

such that d and the counit and unit of the adjunctions together define a distinguished triangle

$$\tau^{\le 0} A \to A \to \tau^{\ge 1} A\ \stackrel{d}{\to}\ \tau^{\le 0} A[1].$$

Up to unique isomorphism, this is the unique distinguished triangle of the form $X \to A \to Y \to X[1]$ with $X$ and $Y$ objects of $\mathcal{D}^{\le 0}$ and $\mathcal{D}^{\ge 1}$, respectively. It follows from the existence of this triangle that an object $A$ lies in $\mathcal{D}^{\le n}$ (resp. $\mathcal{D}^{\ge n}$) if and only if $\tau^{\ge n+1}(A) = 0$ (resp. $\tau^{\le n-1}(A) = 0$).

The existence of $\tau^{\le 0}$ implies the existence of the other truncation functors by shifting and taking opposite categories. If $A$ is an object of $\mathcal{D}$, the third axiom for a t-structure asserts the existence of an $X$ in $\mathcal{D}^{\le 0}$ and a morphism $X \to A$ fitting into a certain distinguished triangle. For each $A$, fix one such triangle and define $\tau^{\le 0}(A) = X$. The axioms for a t-structure imply that, for any object $T$ of $\mathcal{D}^{\le 0}$, we have

$$\operatorname{Hom}(T, X) \cong \operatorname{Hom}(T, A),$$

with the isomorphism being induced by the morphism $X \to A$. This exhibits $X$ as a solution to a certain universal mapping problem. Standard results on adjoint functors now imply that $X$ is unique up to unique isomorphism and that there is a unique way to define $\tau^{\le 0}$ on morphisms that makes it a right adjoint. This proves the existence of $\tau^{\le 0}$ and hence the existence of all the truncation functors.

Repeated truncation for a t-structure behaves similarly to repeated truncation for complexes. If $n \le m$, then there are natural transformations

$$\begin{align}
\tau^{\le n} &\to \tau^{\le m}, \\
\tau^{\ge n} &\to \tau^{\ge m},
\end{align}$$

which yield natural equivalences

$$\begin{align}
\tau^{\le n}\ &\stackrel{\sim}{\to}\ \tau^{\le n} \circ \tau^{\le m}, \\
\tau^{\ge m}\ &\stackrel{\sim}{\to}\ \tau^{\ge m} \circ \tau^{\ge n}, \\
\tau^{\ge n} \circ \tau^{\le m} \ &\stackrel{\sim}{\to}\ \tau^{\le m} \circ \tau^{\ge n}.
\end{align}$$

== Cohomology functors ==
The nth cohomology functor $H^n$ is defined as

$$H^n = \tau^{\le 0} \circ \tau^{\ge 0} \circ [n].$$

As the name suggests, this is a cohomological functor in the usual sense for a triangulated category. That is, for any distinguished triangle $X \to Y \to Z \to X[1]$, we obtain a long exact sequence

$$\cdots \to H^i(X) \to H^i(Y) \to H^i(Z) \to H^{i + 1}(X) \to \cdots.$$

In applications to algebraic topology, the cohomology functors may be denoted $\pi_n$ instead of $H^n$. The cohomology functors take values in the heart $\mathcal{D}^\heartsuit$. By one of the repeated truncation identities above, up to natural equivalence it is equivalent to define

$$H^n = \tau^{\ge 0} \circ \tau^{\le 0} \circ [n].$$

For the natural t-structure on a derived category $D(\mathcal{A})$, the cohomology functor $H^n$ is, up to quasi-isomorphism, the usual nth cohomology group of a complex. However, considered as functors on complexes, this is not true. Consider, for example, $H^0$ as defined in terms of the natural t-structure. By definition, this is

$$\begin{align}
H^0(A^\bullet)
&= \tau^{\le 0}(\tau^{\ge 0}(A^\bullet)) \\
&= \tau^{\le 0}(\cdots \to 0 \to A^{-1} / \ker d^{-1} \to A^0 \to A^1 \to \cdots) \\
&= (\cdots \to 0 \to A^{-1} / \ker d^{-1} \to \ker d^0 \to 0 \to \cdots).
\end{align}$$

This complex is non-zero in degrees $-1$ and $0$, so it is clearly not the same as the zeroth cohomology group of the complex $A^\bullet$. However, the non-trivial differential is an injection, so the only non-trivial cohomology is in degree $0$, where it is $\ker d^0 / \operatorname{im} d^{-1}$, the zeroth cohomology group of the complex $A^\bullet$. It follows that the two possible definitions of $H^0(A^\bullet)$ are quasi-isomorphic.

A t-structure is non-degenerate if the intersection of all $\mathcal{D}^{\le n}$, as well as the intersection of all $\mathcal{D}^{\ge n}$, consists only of zero objects. For a non-degenerate t-structure, the collection of functors $\{H^n\}_{n \in \mathbf{Z}}$ is conservative. Moreover, in this case, $\mathcal{D}^{\le n}$ (resp. $\mathcal{D}^{\ge n}$) may be identified with the full subcategory of those objects $A$ for which $H^i(A) = 0$ for $i > n$ (resp. $i < n$).

== Exact functors ==
For $i = 1, 2$, let $\mathcal{D}_i$ be a triangulated category with a fixed t-structure $(\mathcal{D}_i^{\le 0}, \mathcal{D}_i^{\ge 0})$. Suppose that $F \colon \mathcal{D}_1 \to \mathcal{D}_2$ is an exact functor (in the usual sense for triangulated categories, that is, up to a natural equivalence it commutes with translation and preserves distinguished triangles). Then $F$ is:

- Left t-exact if $F(\mathcal{D}_1^{\ge 0}) \subseteq \mathcal{D}_2^{\ge 0}$,
- Right t-exact if $F(\mathcal{D}_1^{\le 0}) \subseteq \mathcal{D}_2^{\le 0}$, and
- t-exact if it is both left and right t-exact.

It is elementary to see that if $F$ is fully faithful and t-exact, then an object $A$ of $\mathcal{D}_1$ is in $\mathcal{D}_1^{\le 0}$ (resp. $\mathcal{D}_1^{\ge 0}$) if and only if $FA$ is in $\mathcal{D}_2^{\le 0}$ (resp. $\mathcal{D}_2^{\ge 0}$). It is also elementary to see that if $G \colon \mathcal{D}_2 \to \mathcal{D}_3$ is another left (resp. right) t-exact functor, then the composite $G \circ F$ is also left (resp. right) t-exact.

The motivation for the study of one-sided t-exactness properties is that they lead to one-sided exactness properties on hearts. Let $\iota_i^\heartsuit \colon \mathcal{D}_i^\heartsuit \to \mathcal{D}_i$ be the inclusion. Then there is a composite functor

$${}^pF = H^0 \circ F \circ \iota_1^\heartsuit \colon \mathcal{D}_1^\heartsuit \to \mathcal{D}_2^\heartsuit.$$

It can be shown that if $F$ is left (resp. right) exact, then ${}^pF$ is also left (resp. right) exact, and that if $G$ is also left (resp. right) exact, then ${}^p(G \circ F) = ({}^pG) \circ ({}^pF)$.

If $F$ is right (resp. left) t-exact, and if $A$ is in $\mathcal{D}^{\le 0}$ (resp. $\mathcal{D}^{\ge 0}$), then there is a natural isomorphism ${}^pF(H^0A)\ \stackrel{\sim}{\to}\ H^0F(A)$ (resp. $H^0F(A)\ \stackrel{\sim}{\to}\ {}^pF(H^0A)$).

If $(T^*, T_*) \colon \mathcal{D}_1 \leftrightarrows \mathcal{D}_2$ are exact functors with $T^*$ left adjoint to $T_*$, then $T^*$ is right t-exact if and only if $T_*$ is left t-exact, and in this case, $({}^pT^*, {}^pT_*)$ are a pair of adjoint functors $\mathcal{D}_1^\heartsuit \leftrightarrows \mathcal{D}_2^\heartsuit$.

== Constructions of t-structures ==
Let $(\mathcal{D}^{\le 0}, \mathcal{D}^{\ge 0})$ be a t-structure on $\mathcal{D}$. If n is an integer, then the translation by n t-structure is $(\mathcal{D}^{\le n}, \mathcal{D}^{\ge n})$. The dual t-structure is the t-structure on the opposite category $\mathcal{D}^\text{op}$ defined by $((\mathcal{D}^{\ge 0})^\text{op}, (\mathcal{D}^{\le 0})^\text{op})$.

Let $\mathcal{D}'$ be a triangulated subcategory of a triangulated category $\mathcal{D}$. If $(\mathcal{D}^{\le 0}, \mathcal{D}^{\ge 0})$ is a t-structure on $\mathcal{D}$, then

$$((\mathcal{D}')^{\le 0}, (\mathcal{D}')^{\ge 0}) = (\mathcal{D}' \cap \mathcal{D}^{\le 0}, \mathcal{D}' \cap \mathcal{D}^{\ge 0})$$

is a t-structure on $\mathcal{D}'$ if and only if $\mathcal{D}'$ is stable under the truncation functor $\tau^{\le 0}$. When this condition holds, the t-structure $((\mathcal{D}')^{\le 0}, (\mathcal{D}')^{\ge 0})$ is called the induced t-structure. The truncation and cohomology functors for the induced t-structure are the restriction to $\mathcal{D}'$ of those on $\mathcal{D}$. Consequently, the inclusion of $\mathcal{D}'$ in $\mathcal{D}$ is t-exact, and $(\mathcal{D}')^\heartsuit = \mathcal{D}^\heartsuit \cap \mathcal{D}'$.

To construct the category of perverse sheaves, it is important to be able to define a t-structure on a category of sheaves over a space by working locally in that space. The precise conditions necessary for this to be possible can be abstracted somewhat to the following setup. Suppose that there are three triangulated categories and two morphisms

$$\mathcal{D}_F\ \stackrel{i_*}{\to}\ \mathcal{D}\ \stackrel{j^*}{\to}\ \mathcal{D}_U$$

satisfying the following properties.

- There are two sequences of triples of adjoint functors $(j_!, j^*, j_*)$ and $(i^*, i_*, i^!)$.
- The functors $i_*$, $j_!$, and $j^*$ are full and faithful, and they satisfy $j^*i_* = 0$.
- There are unique differentials making, for every K in $\mathcal{D}$, exact triangles

$$\begin{align}
j_!j^*K &\to K \to i_*i^*K \to j_!j^*K[1], \\
i_*i^!K &\to K \to j_*j^*K \to i_*i^!K[1].
\end{align}$$

In this case, given t-structures $(\mathcal{D}_U^{\le 0}, \mathcal{D}_U^{\ge 0})$ and $(\mathcal{D}_F^{\le 0}, \mathcal{D}_F^{\ge 0})$ on $\mathcal{D}_U$ and $\mathcal{D}_F$, respectively, there is a t-structure on $\mathcal{D}$ defined by

$$\begin{align}
\mathcal{D}^{\le 0} &= \{ K \in \mathcal{D} \colon j^*K \in \mathcal{D}_U^{\le 0},\ i^*K \in \mathcal{D}_F^{\le 0}\}, \\
\mathcal{D}^{\ge 0} &= \{ K \in \mathcal{D} \colon j^*K \in \mathcal{D}_U^{\ge 0},\ i^!K \in \mathcal{D}_F^{\ge 0}\}.
\end{align}$$

This t-structure is said to be the gluing of the t-structures on U and F. The intended use cases are when $\mathcal{D}$, $\mathcal{D}_U$, and $\mathcal{D}_F$ are bounded below derived categories of sheaves on a space X, an open subset U, and the closed complement F of U. The functors $j^*$ and $i_*$ are the usual pullback and pushforward functors. This works, in particular, when the sheaves in question are left modules over a sheaf of rings $\mathcal{O}$ on X and when the sheaves are ℓ-adic sheaves.

Many t-structures arise by means of the following fact: in a triangulated category with arbitrary direct sums, and a set $S_0$ of compact objects in $\mathcal{D}$, the subcategories

$$\begin{align}
\mathcal{D}^{\ge 1} &= \{X \in \mathcal{D} \colon \operatorname{Hom}(S_0[-n], X) = 0, n \ge 0\}, \\
\mathcal{D}^{\le 0} &= \{Y \in \mathcal{D} \colon \operatorname{Hom}(Y, \mathcal{D}^{\ge 1}) = 0\},
\end{align}$$

can be shown to be a t-structure. The resulting t-structure is said to be generated by $S_0$.

Given an abelian subcategory $\mathcal{C}$ of a triangulated category $\mathcal{D}$, it is possible to construct a subcategory of $\mathcal{D}$ and a t-structure on that subcategory whose heart is $\mathcal{C}$.

== On stable ∞-categories ==
The elementary theory of t-structures carries over to the case of ∞-categories with few changes. Let $\mathcal{D}$ be a stable ∞-category. A t-structure on $\mathcal{D}$ is defined to be a t-structure on its homotopy category $\mathrm{h}\mathcal{D}$ (which is a triangulated category). A t-structure on an ∞-category can be notated either homologically or cohomologically, just as in the case of a triangulated category.

Suppose that $\mathcal{D}$ is an ∞-category with homotopy category $\mathrm{h}\mathcal{D}$ and that $(\mathrm{h}\mathcal{D}_{\ge 0}, \mathrm{h}\mathcal{D}_{\le 0})$ is a t-structure on $\mathrm{h}\mathcal{D}$. Then, for each integer n, we define $\mathcal{D}_{\ge n}$ and $\mathcal{D}_{\le n}$ to be the full subcategories of $\mathcal{D}$ spanned by the objects in $\mathrm{h}\mathcal{D}_{\ge n}$ and $\mathrm{h}\mathcal{D}_{\le n}$, respectively. Define

$$\begin{align}
\iota_{\ge n} &\colon \mathcal{D}_{\ge n} \to \mathcal{D}, \\
\iota_{\le n} &\colon \mathcal{D}_{\le n} \to \mathcal{D}
\end{align}$$

to be the inclusion functors. Just as in the case of a triangulated category, these admit a right and a left adjoint, respectively, the truncation functors

$$\begin{align}
\tau_{\ge n} &\colon \mathcal{D} \to \mathcal{D}_{\ge n}, \\
\tau_{\le n} &\colon \mathcal{D} \to \mathcal{D}_{\le n}
\end{align}$$

These functors satisfy the same repeated truncation identities as in the triangulated category case.

The heart of a t-structure on $\mathcal{D}$ is defined to be the ∞-subcategory $\mathcal{D}^\heartsuit = \mathcal{D}_{\ge 0} \cap \mathcal{D}_{\le 0}$. The category $\mathcal{D}^\heartsuit$ is equivalent to the nerve of its homotopy category $\mathrm{h}\mathcal{D}^\heartsuit$. The cohomology functor $\pi_n$ is defined to be $\tau_{\ge 0} \circ \tau_{\le 0} \circ [-n]$, or equivalently $\tau_{\le 0} \circ \tau_{\ge 0} \circ [-n]$.

The existence of $\tau_{\le n}$ means that $\iota_{\le n}$ is, by definition, a localization functor. In fact, there is a bijection between t-structures on $\mathcal{D}$ and certain kinds of localization functors called t-localizations. These are localization functors L whose essential image is closed under extension, meaning that if $X \to Y \to Z$ is a fiber sequence with X and Z in the essential image of L, then Y is also in the essential image of L. Given such a localization functor L, the corresponding t-structure is defined by

$$\begin{align}
\mathcal{D}_{\ge 0} &= \{A \colon LA \simeq 0\}, \\
\mathcal{D}_{\le -1} &= \{A \colon LA \simeq A\}.
\end{align}$$

t-localization functors can also be characterized in terms of the morphisms f for which Lf is an equivalence. A set of morphisms S in an ∞-category $\mathcal{D}$ is quasisaturated if it contains all equivalences, if any 2-simplex in $\mathcal{D}$ with two of its non-degenerate edges in S has its third non-degenerate edge in S, and if it is stable under pushouts. If $L \colon \mathcal{D} \to \mathcal{D}$ is a localization functor, then the set S of all morphisms f for which Lf is an equivalence is quasisaturated. Then L is a t-localization functor if and only if S is the smallest quasisaturated set of morphisms containing all morphisms $\{0 \to X \colon LX \simeq 0\}$.

The derived category of an abelian category has several subcategories corresponding to different boundedness conditions. A t-structure on a stable ∞-category can be used to construct similar subcategories. Specifically,

$$\begin{align}
\mathcal{D}_+ &= \bigcup_{n \in \mathbf{Z}} \mathcal{D}_{\le n}, \\
\mathcal{D}_- &= \bigcup_{n \in \mathbf{Z}} \mathcal{D}_{\ge n}, \\
\mathcal{D}_b &= \mathcal{D}_+ \cap \mathcal{D}_-.
\end{align}$$

These are stable subcategories of $\mathcal{D}$. One says that $\mathcal{D}$ is left bounded (with respect to the given t-structure) if $\mathcal{D} = \mathcal{D}_+$, right bounded if $\mathcal{D} = \mathcal{D}_-$, and bounded if $\mathcal{D} = \mathcal{D}_b$.

It is also possible to form a left or right completion with respect to a t-structure. This is analogous to formally adjoining directed limits or directed colimits. The left completion $\hat\mathcal{D}$ of $\mathcal{D}$ is the homotopy limit of the diagram

$$\cdots \to \mathcal{D}_{\le 2}\ \stackrel{\tau_{\le 1}}{\to}\ \mathcal{D}_{\le 1}\ \stackrel{\tau_{\le 0}}{\to}\ \mathcal{D}_{\le 0}\ \stackrel{\tau_{\le -1}}{\to}\ \cdots.$$

The right completion is defined dually. The left and right completions are themselves stable ∞-categories which inherit a canonical t-structure. There is a canonical map from $\mathcal{D}$ to either of its completions, and this map is t-exact. We say that $\mathcal{D}$ is left complete or right complete if the canonical map to its left or right completion, respectively, is an equivalence.

== Related concepts ==
If the requirement $D^{\le 0}\subset D^{\le 1}$, $D^{\ge 1}\subset D^{\ge 0};$ is replaced by the opposite inclusion

$D^{\le 0}\supset D^{\le 1}$, $D^{\ge 1}\supset D^{\ge 0},$

and the other two axioms kept the same, the resulting notion is called a co-t-structure or weight structure.
