= Category of small categories =

Category whose objects are small categories and whose morphisms are functors

In mathematics, specifically in category theory, the category of small categories, denoted by Cat, is the category whose objects are all small categories and whose morphisms are functors between categories. Cat may actually be regarded as a 2-category with natural transformations serving as 2-morphisms.

The initial object of Cat is the empty category 0, which is the category of no objects and no morphisms. The terminal object is the terminal category or trivial category 1 with a single object and morphism.

The category Cat is itself a large category, and therefore not an object of itself. In order to avoid problems analogous to Russell's paradox one cannot form the “category of all categories”. But it is possible to form a quasicategory (meaning objects and morphisms merely form a conglomerate) of all categories.

== Free category ==
The category Cat has a forgetful functor U into the quiver category Quiv:

U : Cat → Quiv

This functor forgets the identity morphisms of a given category, and it forgets morphism compositions. The left adjoint of this functor is a functor F taking Quiv to the corresponding free categories:

F : Quiv → Cat

== 1-Categorical properties ==
- Cat has all small limits and colimits.
- Cat is a Cartesian closed category, with exponential $D^C$ given by the functor category $\mathrm{Fun}(C, D)$.
- Cat is not locally Cartesian closed.
- Cat is locally finitely presentable.

== See also ==
- Nerve of a category
- Universal set, the notion of a 'set of all sets'
