= Coherent category =

Category in mathematical category theory

In category theory in mathematics, a coherent category is a regular category in which the poset of subobjects $\mathrm{Sub}(X)$ has finite unions and each $f^{*}: \mathrm{Sub} (B) \rightarrow \mathrm{Sub} (A)$ preserves them. Makkai & Reyes (1977) called logical categories, and according to Makkai & Reyes (1977), the coherent category was introduced by Joyal and Gonzalo E. Reyes.

== Coherent category ==
=== Axiom ===
Let $\mathcal{C}$ be a category. We will say that $\mathcal{C}$ is coherent category if it satisfies the following axioms:

- The category $\mathcal{C}$ admits finite limits.
- Every morphism $f : X \rightarrow Z$ in $\mathcal{C}$ admits a factorization $X \mathrel{\stackrel g \longrightarrow} Y \mathrel{\stackrel h \longrightarrow} Z$ where g is an effective epimorphism and h is a monomorphism.
- For every object $X \in \mathcal{C}$, the poset $\mathrm{Sub}(X)$ have "finite" unions which are stable under pullback, then $\mathrm{Sub}(X)$ is an upper semilattice.
- The collection of effective epimorphisms in $\mathcal{C}$ is stable under pullback.
- For every morphism $f : X \rightarrow Y$ in $\mathcal{C}$, the map $f^{-1} : \mathrm{Sub}(Y) \rightarrow \mathrm{Sub}(X)$ is a homomorphism of upper semilattices.

=== Coherent functor ===
A functor $f : \mathcal{C} \rightarrow \mathcal{D}$ between coherent categories is called coherent functor if it is a regular functor which preserves finite unions.

=== Example ===
- Every coherent category admits an initial object $0$ which is strict, that is every morphism $X \rightarrow 0$ is an isomorphism.
- For every object $X$ of a coherent category $\mathcal{C}$, the poset of subobjects $\mathrm{Sub} (X)$ is distributive lattice.
- If $\mathcal{C}$ is coherent, every functor category $\mathcal{C}^\mathcal{D}$ is again coherent.

== Heyting category ==
A Heyting category is a coherent category $\mathcal{C}$ in which $f^{*}: \mathrm{Sub} (B) \rightarrow \mathrm{Sub} (A)$ has a right adjoint $\forall_f: \mathrm{Sub} (A) \rightarrow \mathrm{Sub} (B)$. The binary operation on subobjects thus defined is stable under pullback.

=== Heyting functor ===
A Heyting functor between Heyting category is a coherent functor which commutes up to isomorphism with right adjoints $\forall_f$.

=== Joyal's completeness theorem ===
Let $\mathcal{A}$ be a coherent category and $\mathrm{Mod}(\mathcal{A})$ is the category of coherent functors from $\mathcal{A}$ to $\mathrm{Sets}$. Then the evaluation functor

$e_{\mathcal A}: \mathcal{A} \mathrel{\stackrel {ev} \longrightarrow} \mathrm{Sets}^{\mathrm{Mod}(\mathcal{A})}$

is conservative and preserves all finite limits, stable finite sups, stable images and stable $\forall_f (\mathcal{A})$ existing in $\mathcal A$.

If $\mathcal{A}$ is a (small) Heyting category, then $e_{\mathcal A}$ is a conservative Heyting functor.

== Geometric category (a.k.a. Infinitary coherent category) ==
A geometric category is a regular category which is well-powered (every $\mathrm{Sub}(X)$ is small) and $\mathrm{Sub}(X)$ have all unions which are stable under pullback. A geometric category is Heyting category by the adjoint functor theorem for posets. Also, every Grothendieck topos (in the sense of Giraud's axioms) is a geometric category.
