= Free category =

In mathematics, the free category or path category generated by a directed graph or quiver is the category that results from freely concatenating arrows together, whenever the target of one arrow is the source of the next.

More precisely, the objects of the category are the vertices of the quiver, and the morphisms are paths between objects. Here, a path is defined as a finite sequence

$$V_0\xrightarrow{\;\;E_0\;\;} V_1\xrightarrow{\;\;E_1\;\;}
\cdots \xrightarrow{E_{n-1}} V_n$$

where $V_k$ is a vertex of the quiver, $E_k$ is an edge of the quiver, and n ranges over the non-negative integers. For every vertex $V$ of the quiver, there is an "empty path" which constitutes the identity morphisms of the category.

The composition operation is concatenation of paths. Given paths

$$V_0\xrightarrow{E_0}\cdots\xrightarrow{E_{n-1}} V_n,\quad V_n\xrightarrow{F_0}W_0\xrightarrow{F_1}\cdots\xrightarrow{F_{m}} W_m,$$

their composition is

$\left(V_n\xrightarrow{F_0}W_0\xrightarrow{F_1}\cdots\xrightarrow{F_{m}} W_m \right) \circ \left(V_0\xrightarrow{E_0}\cdots\xrightarrow{E_{n-1}} V_n \right) := V_0\xrightarrow{E_0}\cdots\xrightarrow{E_{n-1}} V_n\xrightarrow{F_0}W_0\xrightarrow{F_1}\cdots\xrightarrow{F_{m}} W_m$.

Note that the result of the composition starts with the right operand of the composition, and ends with its left operand.

== Examples ==
- If Q is the quiver with one vertex and one edge f from that object to itself, then the free category on Q has as arrows 1, f, f∘f,f∘f∘f, etc.
- Let Q be the quiver with two vertices a, b and two edges e, f from a to b and b to a, respectively. Then the free category on Q has two identity arrows and an arrow for every finite sequence of alternating es and fs, including: e, f, e∘f, f∘e, f∘e∘f, e∘f∘e, etc.
- If Q is the quiver $a\xrightarrow{f}b\xrightarrow{g}c$, then the free category on Q has (in addition to three identity arrows), arrows f, g, and g∘f.
- If a quiver Q has only one vertex, then the free category on Q has only one object, and corresponds to the free monoid on the edges of Q.

== Properties ==
The category of small categories Cat has a forgetful functor U into the quiver category Quiv:

U : Cat → Quiv

which takes objects to vertices and morphisms to arrows. Intuitively, U "[forgets] which arrows are composites and which are identities". This forgetful functor is right adjoint to the functor sending a quiver to the corresponding free category.

=== Universal property ===
The free category on a quiver can be described up to isomorphism by a universal property. Let C : Quiv → Cat be the functor that takes a quiver to the free category on that quiver (as described above), let U be the forgetful functor defined above, and let G be any quiver. Then there is a graph homomorphism I : G → U(C(G)) and given any category D and any graph homomorphism F : G → U(D), there is a unique functor F' : C(G) → D such that U(F')∘I=F, i.e. the following diagram commutes:

The functor C is left adjoint to the forgetful functor U.

== See also ==
- Free strict monoidal category
- Free object
- Adjoint functors
