= Rig category =

Aspect of category theory in mathematics

In category theory, a rig category (also known as bimonoidal category or 2-rig) is a category equipped with two monoidal structures, one distributing over the other.

== Definition ==
A rig category is given by a category $\mathbf C$ equipped with:

- a symmetric monoidal structure $(\mathbf C, \oplus, O)$
- a monoidal structure $(\mathbf C, \otimes, I)$
- distributing natural isomorphisms: $\delta_{A,B,C} : A \otimes (B \oplus C) \simeq (A \otimes B) \oplus (A \otimes C)$ and $\delta'_{A,B,C} : (A \oplus B) \otimes C \simeq (A \otimes C) \oplus (B \otimes C)$
- annihilating (or absorbing) natural isomorphisms: $a_A : O \otimes A \simeq O$ and $a'_A : A \otimes O \simeq O$

Those structures are required to satisfy a number of coherence conditions.

== Examples ==
- Set, the category of sets with the disjoint union as $\oplus$ and the cartesian product as $\otimes$. Such categories where the multiplicative monoidal structure is the categorical product and the additive monoidal structure is the coproduct are called distributive categories.
- Vect, the category of vector spaces over a field, with the direct sum as $\oplus$ and the tensor product as $\otimes$.

== Strictification ==
Requiring all isomorphisms involved in the definition of a rig category to be strict does not give a useful definition, as it implies an equality $A \oplus B = B \oplus A$ which signals a degenerate structure. However it is possible to turn most of the isomorphisms involved into equalities.

A rig category is semi-strict if the two monoidal structures involved are strict, both of its annihilators are equalities and one of its distributors is an equality. Any rig category is equivalent to a semi-strict one.
