= Stable ∞-category =

In category theory, a branch of mathematics, a stable ∞-category is an ∞-category such that

- (i) It has a zero object.
- (ii) Every morphism in it admits a fiber and cofiber.
- (iii) A triangle in it is a fiber sequence if and only if it is a cofiber sequence.

The homotopy category of a stable ∞-category is triangulated. A stable ∞-category admits finite limits and colimits.

Examples: the derived category of an abelian category and the ∞-category of spectra are both stable.

A stabilization of an ∞-category C having finite limits and base point is a functor from the stable ∞-category S to C. It preserves limits. The objects in the image have the structure of infinite loop spaces; whence, the notion is a generalization of the corresponding notion (stabilization (topology)) in classical algebraic topology.

By definition, the t-structure of a stable ∞-category is the t-structure of its homotopy category. Let C be a stable ∞-category with a t-structure. Then every filtered object $X(i), i \in \mathbb{Z}$ in C gives rise to a spectral sequence $E^{p, q}_r$, which, under some conditions, converges to $\pi_{p+q} \operatorname{colim} X(i).$ By the Dold–Kan correspondence, this generalizes the construction of the spectral sequence associated to a filtered chain complex of abelian groups.
