= Dinatural transformation =

Generalization of natural transformations

In category theory, a branch of mathematics, a dinatural transformation $\alpha$ between two functors

$$S,T : C^{\mathrm{op}}\times C\to D,$$

written

$$\alpha : S\ddot\to T,$$

is a function that to every object $c$ of $C$ associates an arrow

$\alpha_c : S(c,c)\to T(c,c)$ of $D$

and satisfies the following coherence property: for every morphism $f:c\to c'$ of $C$ the diagram

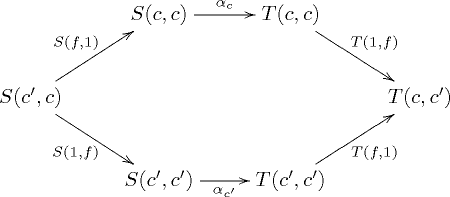

commutes. Note the direction of $S(f,g)$ is opposite along $f$ in the first component since it is contravariant.

The composition of two dinatural transformations need not be dinatural.

== See also ==
- Extranatural transformation
- Natural transformation
