= Leinster group =

In mathematics, a group-theoretic analogue of the perfect numbers

In mathematics, a Leinster group is a finite group whose order equals the sum of the orders of its proper normal subgroups.

The Leinster groups are named after Tom Leinster, a mathematician at the University of Edinburgh, who wrote about them in a paper written in 1996 but not published until 2001. He called them "perfect groups" and later "immaculate groups", but they were renamed as the Leinster groups by De Medts & Maróti (2013) because "perfect group" already had a different meaning (a group that equals its commutator subgroup).

Leinster groups give a group-theoretic way of analyzing the perfect numbers and of approaching the still-unsolved problem of the existence of odd perfect numbers. For a cyclic group, the orders of the subgroups are just the divisors of the order of the group, so a cyclic group is a Leinster group if and only if its order is a perfect number. More strongly, as Leinster proved, an abelian group is a Leinster group if and only if it is a cyclic group whose order is a perfect number. Moreover Leinster showed that dihedral Leinster groups are in one-to-one correspondence with odd perfect numbers, so the existence of odd perfect numbers is equivalent to the existence of dihedral Leinster groups.

== Examples ==
The cyclic groups whose order is a perfect number are Leinster groups.

It is possible for a non-abelian Leinster group to have odd order; an example of order 355433039577 was constructed by François Brunault.

Other examples of non-abelian Leinster groups include certain groups of the form $\operatorname{A}_n \times \operatorname{C}_m$, where $\operatorname{A}_n$ is an alternating group and $\operatorname{C}_m$ is a cyclic group. For instance, the groups $\operatorname{A}_5 \times \operatorname{C}_{15128}$, $\operatorname{A}_6 \times \operatorname{C}_{366776}$, $\operatorname{A}_{7} \times \operatorname{C}_{5919262622}$ and $\operatorname{A}_{10} \times \operatorname{C}_{691816586092}$ are Leinster groups. The same examples can also be constructed with symmetric groups, i.e., groups of the form $\operatorname{S}_n \times \operatorname{C}_{m}$, such as $\operatorname{S}_3 \times \operatorname{C}_{5}$.

The possible orders of Leinster groups form the integer sequence

6, 12, 28, 30, 56, 360, 364, 380, 496, 760, 792, 900, 992, 1224, ... (sequence A086792 in the OEIS)

It is unknown whether there are infinitely many Leinster groups.

== Properties ==
- There are no Leinster groups that are symmetric or alternating.
- There is no Leinster group of order p^{2}q^{2} where p, q are primes.
- No finite semi-simple group is Leinster.
- No p-group can be a Leinster group.
- All abelian Leinster groups are cyclic with order equal to a perfect number.
