= Ringel–Hall algebra =

In mathematics, a Ringel–Hall algebra is a generalization of the Hall algebra, studied by Claus Michael Ringel (1990). It has a basis of equivalence classes of objects of an abelian category, and the structure constants for this basis are related to the numbers of extensions of objects in the category.
