= Cubical set =

In topology, a branch of mathematics, a cubical set is a set-valued contravariant functor on the category of (various) n-cubes.

Cubical sets have been considered as an alternative to simplicial sets in combinatorial topology, including in the early work of Daniel Kan and Jean-Pierre Serre. They have also been developed in computer science, in particular in concurrency theory and in homotopy type theory.

== See also ==
- Simplicial presheaf
