= Exact completion =

In category theory, a branch of mathematics, the exact completion constructs a Barr-exact category from any finitely complete category. It is used to form the effective topos and other realizability toposes.

== Construction ==
Let C be a category with finite limits. Then the exact completion of C (denoted C_{ex}) has for its objects pseudo-equivalence relations in C. A pseudo-equivalence relation is like an equivalence relation except that it need not be jointly monic. An object in C_{ex} thus consists of two objects X_{0} and X_{1} and two parallel morphisms x_{0} and x_{1} from X_{1} to X_{0} such that there exist a reflexivity morphism r from X_{0} to X_{1} such that x_{0}r = x_{1}r = 1_{X_{0}}; a symmetry morphism s from X_{1} to itself such that x_{0}s = x_{1} and x_{1}s = x_{0}; and a transitivity morphism t from X_{1} × _{x_{1}, X_{0}, x_{0}} X_{1} to X_{1} such that x_{0}t = x_{0}p and x_{1}t = x_{1}q, where p and q are the two projections of the aforementioned pullback. A morphism from (X_{0}, X_{1}, x_{0}, x_{1}) to (Y_{0}, Y_{1}, y_{0}, y_{1}) in C_{ex} is given by an equivalence class of morphisms f_{0} from X_{0} to Y_{0} such that there exists a morphism f_{1} from X_{1} to Y_{1} such that y_{0}f_{1} = f_{0}x_{0} and y_{1}f_{1} = f_{0}x_{1}, with two such morphisms f_{0} and g_{0} being equivalent if there exists a morphism e from X_{0} to Y_{1} such that y_{0}e = f_{0} and y_{1}e = g_{0}.

== Examples ==
- If the axiom of choice holds, then Set_{ex} is equivalent to Set.
- More generally, let C be a small category with finite limits. Then the category of presheaves Set^{C^{op}} is equivalent to the exact completion of the coproduct completion of C.
- The effective topos is the exact completion of the category of assemblies.

== Properties ==
- If C is an additive category, then C_{ex} is an abelian category.
- If C is cartesian closed or locally cartesian closed, then so is C_{ex}.

== See also ==
- setoid
