= Adequate subcategory =

In category theory, a branch of mathematics, an adequate subcategory of a category X is an analog of a dense subspace in topology for presheaves: namely, a subcategory $i : A \hookrightarrow X$ such that the restriction of the Yoneda embedding $X \hookrightarrow \mathbf{P}(X)$ along $i$ is still fully faithful. The notion was introduced by Isbell in 1960. Note some authors use the term dense subcategory for this notion, although it can mean a different thing in other contexts.
