= Freyd cover =

In the mathematical discipline of category theory, the Freyd cover or scone category is a construction that yields a set-like construction out of a given category. The only requirement is that the original category has a terminal object. The scone category inherits almost any categorical construct the original category has. Scones can be used to generally describe proofs that use logical relations.

The Freyd cover is named after Peter Freyd. The other name, "scone", is intended to suggest that it is like a cone, but with the Sierpiński space in place of the unit interval.

== Definition ==
Formally, the scone of a category C with a terminal object 1 is the comma category $1_\text{Set} \downarrow \operatorname{Hom}_C(1,-)$.

== See also ==
- Artin gluing
