= Reedy category =

Type of category in mathematics

In mathematics, especially category theory, a Reedy category is a category R that has a structure so that the functor category from R to a model category M would also get the induced model category structure. A prototypical example is the simplex category or its opposite. It was introduced by Christopher Reedy in his unpublished manuscript.

== Definition ==
A Reedy category consists of the following data: a category R, two wide (lluf) subcategories $R_-, R_+$ and a functorial factorization of each map into a map in $R_-$ followed by a map in $R_+$ that are subject to the condition: for some total preordering (degree), the nonidentity maps in $R_-, R_+$ lower or raise degrees.

Note some authors such as nlab require each factorization to be unique.

== Reedy model structure ==
A Reedy model structure is a canonical model-category structure placed on the functor category M^R when R is a Reedy category and M is a model category.

== Eilenberg–Zilber category ==
An Eilenberg–Zilber category is a variant of a Reedy category.

== Literature ==
- Barwick, Clark (2007), On Reedy Model Categories, arXiv:0708.2832
- Cisinski, Denis-Charles (2023). Higher Categories and Homotopical Algebra (PDF). Cambridge University Press. ISBN 978-1-108-47320-0.
- Clemens Berger, Ieke Moerdijk, On an extension of the notion of Reedy category, Mathematische Zeitschrift, 269, 2011 (arXiv:0809.3341, doi:10.1007/s00209-010-0770-x)
- Tim Campion, Cubical sites as Eilenberg-Zilber categories, 2023, arXiv:2303.06206
