= End (category theory) =

Mathematical concept

In category theory, an end of a functor $S\colon\mathbf{C}^{\mathrm{op}}\times\mathbf{C}\to \mathbf{X}$ is a universal dinatural transformation from an object $e$ of $\mathbf X$ to $S$.

More explicitly, this is a pair $(e,\omega)$, where $e$ is an object of $\mathbf X$ and $\omega\colon e\ddot\to S$ is an extranatural transformation such that for every extranatural transformation $\beta\colon x\ddot\to S$ there exists a unique morphism $h\colon x\to e$ of $\mathbf X$ with $\beta_a=\omega_a\circ h$ for every object $a$ of $\mathbf C$.

By abuse of language the object $e$ is often called the end of the functor $S$ (forgetting $\omega$) and is written

$$e=\int_c^{} S(c,c)\text{ or just }\int_\mathbf{C}^{} S.$$

Ends can also be described using limits. If $\mathbf X$ is complete and $\mathbf C$ is small, the end can be described as the equalizer in the diagram

$$\int_c S(c, c) \to \prod_{c \in C} S(c, c) \rightrightarrows \prod_{c \to c'} S(c, c'),$$

where the first morphism being equalized is induced by $S(c, c) \to S(c, c')$ and the second is induced by $S(c', c') \to S(c, c')$.

== Coend ==
The definition of the coend of a functor $S\colon \mathbf{C}^{\mathrm{op}}\times\mathbf{C}\to\mathbf{X}$ is the dual of the definition of an end.

Thus, a coend of $S$ consists of a pair $(d,\zeta)$, where $d$ is an object of $\mathbf X$ and $\zeta\colon S\ddot\to d$ is an extranatural transformation, such that for every extranatural transformation $\gamma\colon S\ddot\to x$ there exists a unique morphism $g\colon d\to x$ of $\mathbf X$ with $\gamma_a=g\circ\zeta_a$ for every object $a$ of $\mathbf C$.

The coend $d$ of the functor $S$ is written

$$d=\int_{}^c S(c,c)\text{ or }\int_{}^\mathbf{C} S.$$

Coends have a characterization using limits dual to the characterization of ends. If $\mathbf X$ is cocomplete and $\mathbf C$ is small, then the coend can be described as the coequalizer in the diagram

$$\int^c S(c, c) \leftarrow \coprod_{c \in C} S(c, c) \leftleftarrows \coprod_{c \to c'} S(c', c).$$

== Examples ==
=== Natural transformations ===
Suppose we have functors $F, G : \mathbf{C} \to \mathbf{X}$ then

$$\mathrm{Hom}_{\mathbf{X}}(F(-), G(-)) : \mathbf{C}^{\operatorname{op}} \times \mathbf{C} \to \mathbf{Set}$$.

In this case, the category of sets is complete, so we need only form the equalizer and in this case

$$\int_c \mathrm{Hom}_{\mathbf{X}}(F(c), G(c)) = \mathrm{Nat}(F, G)$$

the natural transformations from $F$ to $G$. Intuitively, a natural transformation from $F$ to $G$ is a morphism from $F(c)$ to $G(c)$ for every $c$ in the category with compatibility conditions. Looking at the equalizer diagram defining the end makes the equivalence clear.

=== Geometric realizations ===
Let $T$ be a simplicial set. That is, $T$ is a functor $\Delta^{\mathrm{op}} \to \mathbf{Set}$. The discrete topology gives a functor $d:\mathbf{Set} \to \mathbf{Top}$, where $\mathbf{Top}$ is the category of topological spaces. Moreover, there is a map $\gamma:\Delta \to \mathbf{Top}$ sending the object $[n]$ of $\Delta$ to the standard $n$-simplex inside $\mathbb{R}^{n+1}$. Finally there is a functor $\mathbf{Top} \times \mathbf{Top} \to \mathbf{Top}$ that takes the product of two topological spaces.

Define $S$ to be the composition of this product functor with $dT \times \gamma$. The coend of $S$ is the geometric realization of $T$.
