= Tom Leinster =

Mathematician

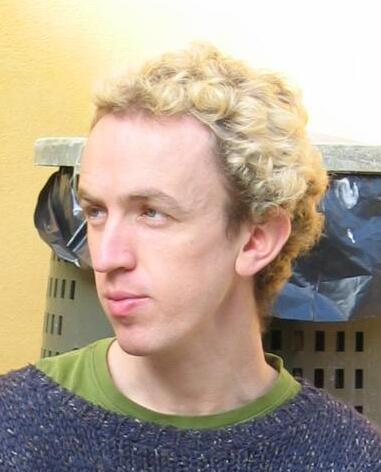
Leinster in 2003

Thomas "Tom" Stephen Hampden Leinster (born 1971) is a British mathematician, known for his work on category theory.

== Education and career ==
Leinster graduated in 2000 with a PhD from the University of Cambridge. His PhD thesis Operads in Higher-Dimensional Category Theory was supervised by Martin Hyland. After teaching at the University of Glasgow, Leinster became, and is now, a professor at the University of Edinburgh. He published textbooks on category theory and higher categories and operads. In the 2010s, he was mainly concerned with a generalisation of the Euler characteristic in category theory, the magnitude. He also considered such generalisations in metric spaces with application in biology (measurement of biodiversity).

== Award and honour ==
Leinster groups (i.e., finite groups whose order is equal to the sum of the orders of their normal subgroups) are named in his honour. He received the 2019 Chauvenet Prize for Rethinking Set Theory (based upon an axiomatisation published in 1964 by F. William Lawvere). He is a frequent author and moderator for the academic group blog n-Category Café, where topics from mathematics, science and philosophy are discussed, often from the perspective of category theory. International media attention resulted from a 2014 article by Leinster in the New Scientist. Leinster's article called, on the basis of ethics, for mathematicians to refuse to work for intelligence agencies. In German-speaking countries, this was reported by, among others, Der Spiegel and Zeit Online.

== Selected publications ==
- Tom Leinster (2001). "A Survey of Definitions of n-Category". arXiv:math/0107188.
- Tom Leinster (2003). "Higher Operads, Higher Categories". arXiv:math/0305049.
- Tom Leinster (2016). "Basic Category Theory". arXiv:1612.09375 [math.CT].
- Tom Leinster (May 2014). "Rethinking Set Theory". The American Mathematical Monthly. 121 (5): 403–415. arXiv:1212.6543. doi:10.4169/amer.math.monthly.121.05.403.
- Leinster, Tom; Meckes, Mark W. (2017). "The magnitude of a metric space: from category theory to geometric measure theory by Tom Leinster and Mark W. Meckes". In Nicola Gigli (ed.). Measure Theory in Non-Smooth Spaces. De Gruyter. arXiv:1606.00095. doi:10.1515/9783110550832-005. ISBN 978-3-11-055083-2.
