= Ind-completion =

In mathematics, process for extending a category

In mathematics, the ind-completion or ind-construction is the process of freely adding filtered colimits to a given category C. The objects in this ind-completed category, denoted Ind(C), are known as direct systems, they are functors from a small filtered category I to C.

The dual concept is the pro-completion, Pro(C).

== Definitions ==
=== Filtered categories ===
Direct systems depend on the notion of filtered categories. For example, the category N, whose objects are natural numbers, and with exactly one morphism from n to m whenever $n \le m$, is a filtered category.

=== Direct systems ===
A direct system or an ind-object in a category C is defined to be a functor

$$F : I \to C$$

from a small filtered category I to C. For example, if I is the category N mentioned above, this datum is equivalent to a sequence

$$X_0 \to X_1 \to \cdots$$

of objects in C together with morphisms as displayed.

=== The ind-completion ===
Ind-objects in C form a category ind-C.

Two ind-objects

$$F:I\to C$$

and

$G:J\to C$ determine a functor

I^{op} x J $\to$ Sets,

namely the functor

$$\operatorname{Hom}_C(F(i),G(j)).$$

The set of morphisms between F and G in Ind(C) is defined to be the colimit of this functor in the second variable, followed by the limit in the first variable:

$$\operatorname{Hom}_{\operatorname{Ind}\text{-}C}(F,G) = \lim_i \operatorname{colim}_j \operatorname{Hom}_C(F(i), G(j)).$$

More colloquially, this means that a morphism consists of a collection of maps $F(i) \to G(j_i)$ for each i, where $j_i$ is (depending on i) large enough.

=== Relation between C and Ind(C) ===
The final category I = {*} consisting of a single object * and only its identity morphism is an example of a filtered category. In particular, any object X in C gives rise to a functor

$$\{*\} \to C, * \mapsto X$$

and therefore to a functor

$$C \to \operatorname{Ind}(C), X \mapsto (* \mapsto X).$$

This functor is, as a direct consequence of the definitions, fully faithful. Therefore Ind(C) can be regarded as a larger category than C.

Conversely, there need not in general be a natural functor

$$\operatorname{Ind}(C) \to C.$$

However, if C possesses all filtered colimits (also known as direct limits), then sending an ind-object $F: I \to C$ (for some filtered category I) to its colimit

$$\operatorname {colim}_I F(i)$$

does give such a functor, which however is not in general an equivalence. Thus, even if C already has all filtered colimits, Ind(C) is a strictly larger category than C.

Objects in Ind(C) can be thought of as formal direct limits, so that some authors also denote such objects by

$$\text{“}\varinjlim_{i \in I} \text{'' } F(i).$$

This notation is due to Pierre Deligne.

== Universal property of the ind-completion ==
The passage from a category C to Ind(C) amounts to freely adding filtered colimits to the category. This is why the construction is also referred to as the ind-completion of C. This is made precise by the following assertion: any functor $F: C \to D$ taking values in a category D that has all filtered colimits extends to a functor $Ind(C) \to D$ that is uniquely determined by the requirements that its value on C is the original functor F and such that it preserves all filtered colimits.

== Basic properties of ind-categories ==
=== Compact objects ===
Essentially by design of the morphisms in Ind(C), any object X of C is compact when regarded as an object of Ind(C), i.e., the corepresentable functor

$$\operatorname{Hom}_{\operatorname{Ind}(C)}(X, -)$$

preserves filtered colimits. This holds true no matter what C or the object X is, in contrast to the fact that X need not be compact in C. Conversely, any compact object in Ind(C) arises as the image of an object in X.

A category C is called compactly generated, if it is equivalent to $\operatorname{Ind}(C_0)$ for some small category $C_0$. The ind-completion of the category FinSet of finite sets is the category of all sets. Similarly, if C is the category of finitely generated groups, ind-C is equivalent to the category of all groups.

=== Recognizing ind-completions ===
These identifications rely on the following facts: as was mentioned above, any functor $F: C \to D$ taking values in a category D that has all filtered colimits, has an extension

$$\tilde F: \operatorname{Ind}(C) \to D,$$

that preserves filtered colimits. This extension is unique up to equivalence. First, this functor $\tilde F$ is essentially surjective if any object in D can be expressed as a filtered colimits of objects of the form $F(c)$ for appropriate objects c in C. Second, $\tilde F$ is fully faithful if and only if the original functor F is fully faithful and if F sends arbitrary objects in C to compact objects in D.

Applying these facts to, say, the inclusion functor

$$F: \operatorname{FinSet} \subset \operatorname{Set},$$

the equivalence

$$\operatorname{Ind}(\operatorname{FinSet}) \cong \operatorname{Set}$$

expresses the fact that any set is the filtered colimit of finite sets (for example, any set is the union of its finite subsets, which is a filtered system) and moreover, that any finite set is compact when regarded as an object of Set.

== The pro-completion ==
Like other categorical notions and constructions, the ind-completion admits a dual known as the pro-completion: the pro-completion Pro(C) can defined in terms of the ind-completion as

$$\operatorname{Pro}(C) := \operatorname{Ind}(C^{op})^{op}.$$

(The original definition of pro-C is due to Grothendieck (1960).)

Therefore, the objects of Pro(C) are inverse systems or pro-objects in C. By definition, these are direct system in the opposite category $C^{op}$ or, equivalently, functors

$$F: I \to C$$

from a small cofiltered category I.

=== Examples of pro-categories ===
While Pro(C) exists for any category C, several special cases are noteworthy because of connections to other mathematical notions.

- If C is the category of finite groups, then pro-C is equivalent to the category of profinite groups and continuous homomorphisms between them.
- The process of endowing a preordered set with its Alexandrov topology yields an equivalence of the pro-category of the category of finite preordered sets, $\operatorname{Pro}(\operatorname{FinPreord})$, with the category of spectral topological spaces and quasi-compact morphisms.
- Stone duality asserts that the pro-category $\operatorname{Pro}(\operatorname{FinSet})$ of the category of finite sets is equivalent to the category of Stone spaces.

The appearance of topological notions in these pro-categories can be traced to the equivalence, which is itself a special case of Stone duality,

$$\operatorname{FinSet}^{\text{op}} = \operatorname{FinBool}$$

which sends a finite set to the power set (regarded as a finite Boolean algebra). The duality between pro- and ind-objects and known description of ind-completions also give rise to descriptions of certain opposite categories. For example, such considerations can be used to show that the opposite category of the category of vector spaces (over a fixed field) is equivalent to the category of linearly compact vector spaces and continuous linear maps between them.

=== Applications ===
Pro-completions are less prominent than ind-completions, but applications include shape theory. Pro-objects also arise via their connection to pro-representable functors, for example in Grothendieck's Galois theory, and also in Schlessinger's criterion in deformation theory.

=== Related notions ===
Tate objects are a mixture of ind- and pro-objects.

== Infinity-categorical variants ==
The ind-completion (and, dually, the pro-completion) has been extended to ∞-categories by Lurie (2009).

== See also ==
- Direct limit – Special case of colimit in category theory
- Inverse limit – Construction in category theory
- completions in category theory
