= Isbell duality =

Adjunction between a category of co/presheaf under the co/Yoneda embedding

In mathematics, Isbell conjugacy (a.k.a. Isbell duality or Isbell adjunction) (named after John R. Isbell) is a fundamental construction of enriched category theory formally introduced by William Lawvere in 1986. That is a duality between covariant and contravariant representable presheaves associated with an objects of categories under the Yoneda embedding. In addition, Lawvere says; "Then the conjugacies are the first step toward expressing the duality between space and quantity fundamental to mathematics".

== Definition ==
=== Yoneda embedding ===
The (covariant) Yoneda embedding is a covariant functor from a small category $\mathcal{A}$ into the category of presheaves $\left[\mathcal{A}^{op}, \mathcal{V} \right]$ on $\mathcal{A}$, taking $X \in \mathcal{A}$ to the contravariant representable functor:

$y \; (h^{\bullet}) :\mathcal{A} \rightarrow \left[\mathcal{A}^{op}, \mathcal{V} \right]$

$X \mapsto \mathrm{hom} (-,X).$

and the co-Yoneda embedding (a.k.a. dual Yoneda embedding) is a contravariant functor from a small category $\mathcal{A}$ into the opposite of the category of co-presheaves $\left[\mathcal{A}, \mathcal{V} \right]^{op}$ on $\mathcal{A}$, taking $X \in \mathcal{A}$ to the covariant representable functor:

$z \; ({h_{\bullet}}^{op}): \mathcal{A} \rightarrow \left[\mathcal{A}, \mathcal{V} \right]^{op}$

$X \mapsto \mathrm{hom} (X,-).$

=== Isbell duality ===
Origin of symbols $\mathcal{O}$ (“ring of functions”) and $\mathrm{Spec}$ (“spectrum”): Lawvere (1986, p. 169) says that; "$\mathcal{O}$" assigns to each general space the algebra of functions on it, whereas "$\mathrm{Spec}$" assigns to each algebra its “spectrum” which is a general space.

note:In order for this commutative diagram to hold, it is required that $\mathcal{A}$ is small and E is co-complete.

Every functor $F \colon \mathcal{A}^\mathrm{op}\to \mathcal{V}$ has an Isbell conjugate of a functor $F^{\ast} \colon \mathcal{A} \to \mathcal{V}$, given by

$F^{\ast} (X) = \mathrm{hom} (F , y(X)).$

In contrast, every functor $G \colon \mathcal{A} \to \mathcal{V}$ has an Isbell conjugate of a functor $G^{\ast} \colon \mathcal{A}^\mathrm{op} \to \mathcal{V}$ given by

$G^{\ast} (X) = \mathrm{hom} (z(X) , G).$

These two functors are not typically inverses, or even natural isomorphisms. Isbell duality asserts that the relationship between these two functors is an adjunction.

Isbell duality is the relationship between Yoneda embedding and co-Yoneda embedding；

Let $\mathcal{V}$ be a symmetric monoidal closed category, and let $\mathcal{A}$ be a small category enriched in $\mathcal{V}$.

The Isbell duality is an adjunction between the functor categories; $\left(\mathcal{O} \dashv \mathrm{Spec} \right) \colon \left[\mathcal{A}^{op}, \mathcal{V} \right] {\underset{\mathrm{Spec}}{\overset{\mathcal{O}}{\rightleftarrows}}} \left[\mathcal{A}, \mathcal{V} \right]^{op}$.

Applying the nerve construction, the functors $\mathcal{O} \dashv \mathrm{Spec}$ of Isbell duality are such that $\mathcal{O} \cong \mathrm{Lan_{y}z}$ and $\mathrm{Spec} \cong \mathrm{Lan_{z}y}$. (Note: For the symbol Lan, see left Kan extension.)

== See also ==
- Kan extension
- Limit (category theory)
- Isbell completion
- Profunctor

== Bibliography ==
- Avery, Tom; Leinster, Tom (2021), "Isbell conjugacy and the reflexive completion" (PDF), Theory and Applications of Categories, 36: 306–347, arXiv:2102.08290, doi:10.70930/tac/r1jknjot
- Awodey, Steve (2006), Category Theory, doi:10.1093/acprof:oso/9780198568612.001.0001, ISBN 978-0-19-856861-2
- Baez, John C. (2022), "Isbell Duality" (PDF), Notices Amer. Math. Soc., 70: 140–141, arXiv:2212.11079, doi:10.1090/noti2602
- Barr, Michael; Kennison, John F.; Raphael, R. (2009), "Isbell duality for modules", Theory and Applications of Categories, 22: 401–419, doi:10.70930/tac/1zcfxg2x
- Day, Brian J.; Lack, Stephen (2007), "Limits of small functors", Journal of Pure and Applied Algebra, 210 (3): 651–663, arXiv:math/0610439, doi:10.1016/j.jpaa.2006.10.019, MR 2324597, S2CID 15424936.
- Di Liberti, Ivan (2020), "Codensity: Isbell duality, pro-objects, compactness and accessibility", Journal of Pure and Applied Algebra, 224 (10) 106379, arXiv:1910.01014, doi:10.1016/j.jpaa.2020.106379, S2CID 203626566
- Fosco, Loregian (22 July 2021), (Co)end Calculus, Cambridge University Press, arXiv:1501.02503, doi:10.1017/9781108778657, ISBN 9781108746120, S2CID 237839003
- Gutierres, Gonçalo; Hofmann, Dirk (2013), "Approaching Metric Domains", Applied Categorical Structures, 21 (6): 617–650, arXiv:1103.4744, doi:10.1007/s10485-011-9274-z, S2CID 254225188
- Riehl, Emily (2016), Category Theory in Context, Dover Publications, Inc Mineola, New York, ISBN 9780486809038
- Shen, Lili; Zhang, Dexue (2013), "Categories enriched over a quantaloid: Isbell adjunctions and Kan adjunctions" (PDF), Theory and Applications of Categories, 28 (20): 577–615, arXiv:1307.5625, doi:10.70930/tac/6l0334s5
- Isbell, J. R. (1960), "Adequate subcategories", Illinois Journal of Mathematics, 4 (4), doi:10.1215/ijm/1255456274
- Isbell, John R. (1966), "Structure of categories", Bulletin of the American Mathematical Society, 72 (4): 619–656, doi:10.1090/S0002-9904-1966-11541-0, S2CID 40822693
- Imamura, Yuki (2022), "Grothendieck Enriched Categories", Applied Categorical Structures, 30 (5): 1017–1041, arXiv:2105.05108, doi:10.1007/s10485-022-09681-1
- Kelly, Gregory Maxwell (1982), Basic concepts of enriched category theory (PDF), London Mathematical Society Lecture Note Series, vol. 64, Cambridge University Press, Cambridge-New York, ISBN 0-521-28702-2, MR 0651714
- Lawvere, F. W. (1986), "Taking categories seriously", Revista Colombiana de Matemáticas, 20 (3–4): 147–178, MR 0948965
  - Lawvere, F. W. (2005), "Taking categories seriously" (PDF), Reprints in Theory and Applications of Categories (8): 1–24, MR 0948965
- Lawvere, F. William (February 2016), "Birkhoff's Theorem from a geometric perspective: A simple example", Categories and General Algebraic Structures with Applications, 4 (1): 1–8
- Melliès, Paul-André; Zeilberger, Noam (2018), "An Isbell duality theorem for type refinement systems", Mathematical Structures in Computer Science, 28 (6): 736–774, arXiv:1501.05115, doi:10.1017/S0960129517000068, S2CID 2716529
- Pratt, Vaughan (1996), "Broadening the denotational semantics of linear logic", Electronic Notes in Theoretical Computer Science, 3: 155–166, doi:10.1016/S1571-0661(05)80415-3
- Rutten, J.J.M.M. (1998), "Weighted colimits and formal balls in generalized metric spaces", Topology and Its Applications, 89 (1–2): 179–202, doi:10.1016/S0166-8641(97)00224-1
- Sturtz, Kirk (2018), "The factorization of the Giry monad", Advances in Mathematics, 340: 76–105, arXiv:1707.00488, doi:10.1016/j.aim.2018.10.007
  - Sturtz, K. (2019), "Erratum and Addendum: The factorization of the Giry monad", arXiv:1907.00372 [math.CT]
- Wood, R.J (1982), "Some remarks on total categories", Journal of Algebra, 75 (2): 538–545, doi:10.1016/0021-8693(82)90055-2
- Willerton, Simon (2013), "Tight spans, Isbell completions and semi-tropical modules" (PDF), Theory and Applications of Categories, 28 (22): 696–732, arXiv:1302.4370, doi:10.70930/tac/rkp3zgxc
