= Constant function =

Type of mathematical function

In mathematics, a constant function is a function whose (output) value is the same for every input value.

== Basic properties ==
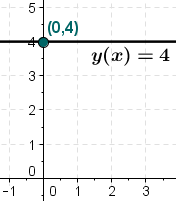
An example of a constant function is y(x) = 4, because the value of y(x) is 4 regardless of the input value x.

As a real-valued function of a real-valued argument, a constant function has the general form y(x) = c or just y = c. For example, the function y(x) = 4 is the specific constant function where the output value is c = 4. The domain of this function is the set of all real numbers. The image of this function is the singleton set {4}. The independent variable x does not appear on the right side of the function expression and so its value is "vacuously substituted"; namely y(0) = 4, y(−2.7) = 4, y(π) = 4, and so on. No matter what value of x is input, the output is 4.

The graph of the constant function y = c is a horizontal line in the plane that passes through the point (0, c). In the context of a polynomial in one variable x, the constant function is called non-zero constant function because it is a polynomial of degree 0, and its general form is f(x) = c, where c is nonzero. This function has no intersection point with the x-axis, meaning it has no root (zero). On the other hand, the polynomial f(x) = 0 is the identically zero function. It is the (trivial) constant function and every x is a root. Its graph is the x-axis in the plane. Its graph is symmetric with respect to the y-axis, and therefore a constant function is an even function.

In the context where it is defined, the derivative of a function is a measure of the rate of change of function values with respect to change in input values. Because a constant function does not change, its derivative is 0. This is often written: $(x \mapsto c)' = 0$. The converse is also true. Namely, if y′(x) = 0 for all real numbers x, then y is a constant function. For example, given the constant function $y(x) = -\sqrt{2}$. The derivative of y is the identically zero function $y'(x) = \left(x \mapsto -\sqrt{2}\right)' = 0$.

== Other properties ==
For functions between preordered sets, constant functions are both order-preserving and order-reversing; conversely, if f is both order-preserving and order-reversing, and if the domain of f is a lattice, then f must be constant.

- Every constant function whose domain and codomain are the same set X is a left zero of the full transformation monoid on X, which implies that it is also idempotent.
- It has zero slope or gradient.
- Every constant function between topological spaces is continuous.
- A constant function factors through the one-point set, the terminal object in the category of sets. This observation is instrumental for F. William Lawvere's axiomatization of set theory, the Elementary Theory of the Category of Sets (ETCS).
- For any non-empty X, every set Y is isomorphic to the set of constant functions in $X \to Y$. For any X and each element y in Y, there is a unique function $\tilde{y}: X \to Y$ such that $\tilde{y}(x) = y$ for all $x \in X$. Conversely, if a function $f: X \to Y$ satisfies $f(x) = f(x')$ for all $x, x' \in X$, $f$ is by definition a constant function.
  - As a corollary, the one-point set is a generator in the category of sets.
  - Every set $X$ is canonically isomorphic to the function set $X^1$, or hom set $\operatorname{hom}(1,X)$ in the category of sets, where 1 is the one-point set. Because of this, and the adjunction between Cartesian products and hom in the category of sets (so there is a canonical isomorphism between functions of two variables and functions of one variable valued in functions of another (single) variable, $\operatorname{hom}(X \times Y, Z) \cong \operatorname{hom}(X(\operatorname{hom}(Y, Z))$) the category of sets is a closed monoidal category with the Cartesian product of sets as tensor product and the one-point set as tensor unit. In the isomorphisms $\lambda: 1 \times X \cong X \cong X \times 1: \rho$ natural in X, the left and right unitors are the projections $p_1$ and $p_2$ the ordered pairs $(*, x)$ and $(x, *)$ respectively to the element $x$, where $*$ is the unique point in the one-point set.

A function on a connected set is locally constant if and only if it is constant.
