= Robert Rosebrugh =

Canadian Category theorist

- Born: Robert Rosebrugh

Academic background
- Education: Dalhousie University
- Thesis: Abstract Families of Algebras (1977)
- Academic advisor: Robert Paré

Academic work
- Discipline: Mathematics
- Sub-discipline: Category theory
- Institutions: Mount Allison University

Robert Rosebrugh is a Canadian category theorist and database theorist. He earned his PhD in mathematics in 1977 at Dalhousie University under the supervision of Robert Paré. He is a professor emeritus at Mount Allison University. He is a founding editor of the journal Theory and Applications of Categories and served as the managing editor from its founding in 1995 until 2020.

Prior to the journal, in 1990 Rosebrugh created Categories, an internet bulletin board for category theory. In 2003, along with William Lawvere, Rosebrugh published a book using categorical algebra as a foundation and described the category of sets for a structural set theory. Rosebrugh connected two theoretical approaches to database view updates to lenses, a type of object studied in category theory, in a 2010 paper.

The journal Theory and Applications of Categories had a festschrift in his honor in 2021
