= Prop (disambiguation) =

A prop is a movable object used by actors on a stage or set.

Prop may also refer to:

== Common uses ==
An object which supports another, such as a(n):

- Construction prop, or jack post
- Mouth prop, used in dentistry
- Pit prop, in mining, used to support the roof of a tunnel

== Arts, entertainment, and media ==
- "Props" (Glee), an episode of Glee

== Science and technology ==
- ProP (transporter), an osmosensory transporter
- Prop-, a prefix in chemistry
- Propylthiouracil (PROP), a thioamide drug

== Sports ==
- Prop (rugby league), a rugby league position
- Prop (rugby union), a rugby union position

== Other uses ==
- PROP (category theory), in mathematics
- Prop, short for propeller, a fan used for vehicle propulsion
- Prop, short for proposition, an initiative or referendum put to a vote on a ballot
- Prop-word, a linguistic term
- Proposition bet, in gambling
- Props, or propers, a slang term for proper respect, also embodied in the fist bump hand gesture

== See also ==
- PROP (disambiguation)
