= Compact object (mathematics) =

Mathematical concept

In mathematics, compact objects, also referred to as finitely presented objects, or objects of finite presentation, are objects in a category satisfying a certain finiteness condition. The terminology is inspired by (and generalized from) the concept of compactness in topology.

== Definition ==
An object X in a category C which admits all filtered colimits (also known as direct limits) is called compact if the functor

$$\operatorname{Hom}_C(X, \cdot) : C \to \mathrm{Sets}, Y \mapsto \operatorname{Hom}_C(X, Y)$$

commutes with filtered colimits, i.e., if the natural map

$$\operatorname{colim} \operatorname{Hom}_C(X, Y_i) \to \operatorname{Hom}_C(X, \operatorname{colim}_i Y_i)$$

is a bijection for any filtered system of objects $Y_i$ in C. Since elements in the filtered colimit at the left are represented by maps $X \to Y_i$, for some i, the surjectivity of the above map amounts to requiring that a map $X \to \operatorname{colim}_i Y_i$ factors over some $Y_i$.

The terminology is motivated by an example arising from topology mentioned below. Several authors also use a terminology which is more closely related to algebraic categories: Adámek & Rosický (1994) use the terminology finitely presented object instead of compact object. Kashiwara & Schapira (2006) call these the objects of finite presentation.

=== Compactness in ∞-categories ===
The same definition also applies if C is an ∞-category, provided that the above set of morphisms gets replaced by the mapping space in C (and the filtered colimits are understood in the ∞-categorical sense, sometimes also referred to as filtered homotopy colimits).

=== Compactness in triangulated categories ===
For a triangulated category C which admits all coproducts, Neeman (2001a) defines an object to be compact if

$$\operatorname{Hom}_C(X, \cdot) : C \to \mathrm{Ab}, Y \mapsto \operatorname{Hom}_C(X, Y)$$

commutes with coproducts. The relation of this notion and the above is as follows: suppose C arises as the homotopy category of a stable ∞-category admitting all filtered colimits. (This condition is widely satisfied, but not automatic.) Then an object in C is compact in Neeman's sense if and only if it is compact in the ∞-categorical sense. The reason is that in a stable ∞-category, $\operatorname{Hom}_C(X, -)$ always commutes with finite colimits since these are limits. Then, one uses a presentation of filtered colimits as a coequalizer (which is a finite colimit) of an infinite coproduct.

== Examples ==
The compact objects in the category of sets are precisely the finite sets.

For a ring R, the compact objects in the category of R-modules are precisely the finitely presented R-modules. In particular, if R is a field, then compact objects are finite-dimensional vector spaces.

Similar results hold for any category of algebraic structures given by operations on a set obeying equational laws. Such categories, called varieties, can be studied systematically using Lawvere theories. For any Lawvere theory T, there is a category Mod(T) of models of T, and the compact objects in Mod(T) are precisely the finitely presented models. For example: suppose T is the theory of groups. Then Mod(T) is the category of groups, and the compact objects in Mod(T) are the finitely presented groups.

The compact objects in the derived category $D(R-\text{Mod})$ of R-modules are precisely the perfect complexes.

Compact topological spaces are not the compact objects in the category of topological spaces. Instead these are precisely the finite sets endowed with the discrete topology. The link between compactness in topology and the above categorical notion of compactness is as follows: for a fixed topological space $X$, there is the category $\text{Open}(X)$ whose objects are the open subsets of $X$ (and inclusions as morphisms). Then, $X$ is a compact topological space if and only if $X$ is compact as an object in $\text{Open}(X)$.

If $C$ is any category, the category of presheaves $\text{PreShv}(C)$ (i.e., the category of functors from $C^{op}$ to sets) has all colimits. The original category $C$ is connected to $\text{PreShv}(C)$ by the Yoneda embedding $h_{(-)}: C \to \text{PreShv}(C), X \mapsto h_{X} := \operatorname{Hom}(-, X)$. For any object $X$ of $C$, $h_X$ is a compact object (of $\text{PreShv}(C)$).

In a similar vein, any category $C$ can be regarded as a full subcategory of the category $\text{Ind}(C)$ of ind-objects in $C$. Regarded as an object of this larger category, any object of $C$ is compact. In fact, the compact objects of $\text{Ind}(C)$ are precisely the objects of $C$ (or, more precisely, their images in $\text{Ind}(C)$).

=== Non-examples ===
==== Derived category of sheaves of Abelian groups on a noncompact X ====
In the unbounded derived category of sheaves of Abelian groups $D(\text{Sh}(X;\text{Ab}))$ for a non-compact topological space $X$, it is generally not a compactly generated category. Some evidence for this can be found by considering an open cover $\mathcal{U} = \{U_i \}_{i \in I}$ (which can never be refined to a finite subcover using the non-compactness of $X$) and taking a map

$\phi\in\text{Hom}(\mathcal{F}^\bullet,\underset{i\in I}{\text{colim}} \mathbb{Z}_{U_i})$

for some $\mathcal{F}^\bullet \in \text{Ob}(D(\text{Sh}(X;\text{Ab})))$. Then, for this map $\phi$ to lift to an element

$\psi \in \underset{i \in I}{\text{colim}} \text{ Hom}(\mathcal{F}^\bullet, \mathbb{Z}_{U_i})$

it would have to factor through some $\mathbb{Z}_{U_i}$, which is not guaranteed. Proving this requires showing that any compact object has support in some compact subset of $X$, and then showing this subset must be empty.

==== Derived category of quasi-coherent sheaves on an Artin stack ====
For algebraic stacks $\mathfrak{X}$ over positive characteristic, the unbounded derived category $D_{qc}(\mathfrak{X})$ of quasi-coherent sheaves is in general not compactly generated, even if $\mathfrak{X}$ is quasi-compact and quasi-separated. In fact, for the algebraic stack $B\mathbb{G}_a$, there are no compact objects other than the zero object. This observation can be generalized to the following theorem: if the stack $\mathfrak{X}$ has a stabilizer group $G$ such that

1. $G$ is defined over a field $k$ of positive characteristic
2. $\overline{G} = G\otimes_k\overline{k}$ has a subgroup isomorphic to $\mathbb{G}_a$

then the only compact object in $D_{qc}(\mathfrak{X})$ is the zero object. In particular, the category is not compactly generated.

This theorem applies, for example, to $G=GL_n$ by means of the embedding $\mathbb{G}_a \to GL_n$ sending a point $x \in \mathbb{G}_a(S)$ to the identity matrix plus $x$ at the $n$-th column in the first row.

== Compactly generated categories ==
In most categories, the condition of being compact is quite strong, so that most objects are not compact. A category $C$ is compactly generated if any object can be expressed as a filtered colimit of compact objects in $C$. For example, any vector space V is the filtered colimit of its finite-dimensional (i.e., compact) subspaces. Hence the category of vector spaces (over a fixed field) is compactly generated.

Categories which are compactly generated and also admit all colimits are called accessible categories.

== Relation to dualizable objects ==
For categories C with a well-behaved tensor product (more formally, C is required to be a monoidal category), there is another condition imposing some kind of finiteness, namely the condition that an object is dualizable. If the monoidal unit in C is compact, then any dualizable object is compact as well. For example, R is compact as an R-module, so this observation can be applied. Indeed, in the category of R-modules the dualizable objects are the finitely presented projective modules, which are in particular compact. In the context of ∞-categories, dualizable and compact objects tend to be more closely linked, for example in the ∞-category of complexes of R-modules, compact and dualizable objects agree. This and more general example where dualizable and compact objects agree are discussed in Ben-Zvi, Francis & Nadler (2010).
