= PROP =

PROP can stand for:

- 6-N-Propylthiouracil (or PROP), a thionamide either tasting very bitter or tasteless depending on genetic makeup
- PROP (category theory), a certain symmetric strict monoidal category, in category theory
- Propulsion Engineer (PROP), space shuttle flight control position
- Preservation of the Rights of Prisoners (PROP), a UK prisoner's rights organisation set up in the early 1970s
- People's Republic of Poland, a.k.a. the Polish People's Republic. The Warsaw Pact state in Poland existing from 1947 to 1949.

== See also ==
- Prop (disambiguation)
