= PROP (category theory) =

Type of monoidal category in category theory

In category theory, a branch of mathematics, a PROP is a symmetric strict monoidal category whose objects are the natural numbers n identified with the finite sets $\{0,1,\ldots,n-1\}$ and whose tensor product is given on objects by the addition on numbers. Because of “symmetric”, for each n, the symmetric group on n letters is given as a subgroup of the automorphism group of n. The name PROP is an abbreviation of "PROduct and Permutation category".

The notion was introduced by Frank Adams and Saunders Mac Lane; the topological version of it was later given by Michael Boardman and Rainer Vogt. Following them, J. P. May then introduced the term “operad”, which is a particular kind of PROP, for the object that Boardman and Vogt called the "category of operators in standard form".

There are the following inclusions of full subcategories:

$$\mathsf{Operads} \subset \tfrac{1}{2}\mathsf{PROP} \subset \mathsf{PROP}$$

where the first category is the category of (symmetric) operads.

== Examples and variants ==
An important elementary class of PROPs are the sets $\mathcal{R}^{\bullet\times\bullet}$ of all matrices (regardless of number of rows and columns) over some fixed ring $\mathcal{R}$. More concretely, these matrices are the morphisms of the PROP; the objects can be taken as either $\{\mathcal{R}^n\}_{n=0}^\infty$ (sets of vectors) or just as the plain natural numbers (since objects do not have to be sets with some structure). In this example:

- Composition $\circ$ of morphisms is ordinary matrix multiplication.
- The identity morphism of an object $n$ (or $\mathcal{R}^n$) is the identity matrix with size $n$.
- The product $\otimes$ acts on objects like addition ($m \otimes n = m+n$ or $\mathcal{R}^m \otimes \mathcal{R}^n = \mathcal{R}^{m+n}$) and on morphisms like an operation of constructing block diagonal matrices:
  $$\alpha \otimes \beta = \begin{bmatrix} \alpha & 0 \\ 0 & \beta \end{bmatrix}$$.
  - The compatibility of composition and product thus boils down to
    $$(A \otimes B) \circ (C \otimes D) = \begin{bmatrix} A & 0 \\ 0 & B \end{bmatrix} \circ \begin{bmatrix} C & 0 \\ 0 & D \end{bmatrix} = \begin{bmatrix} AC & 0 \\ 0 & BD \end{bmatrix} = (A \circ C) \otimes (B \circ D)$$.
  - As an edge case, matrices with no rows ($0 \times n$ matrices) or no columns ($m \times 0$ matrices) are allowed, and with respect to multiplication count as being zero matrices. The $\otimes$ identity is the $0 \times 0$ matrix.
- The permutations in the PROP are the permutation matrices. Thus the left action of a permutation on a matrix (morphism of this PROP) is to permute the rows, whereas the right action is to permute the columns.

There are also PROPs of matrices where the product $\otimes$ is the Kronecker product, but in that class of PROPs the matrices must all be of the form $k^m \times k^n$ (sides are all powers of some common base $k$); these are the coordinate counterparts of appropriate symmetric monoidal categories of vector spaces under tensor product.

Further examples of PROPs:

- the discrete category $\mathbb{N}$ of natural numbers,
- the category FinSet of natural numbers and functions between them,
- the category Bij of natural numbers and bijections,
- the category Inj of natural numbers and injections.

If the requirement “symmetric” is dropped, then one gets the notion of PRO category. If “symmetric” is replaced by braided, then one gets the notion of PROB category.

- the category Bij_{Braid} of natural numbers, equipped with the braid group B_{n} as the automorphisms of each n (and no other morphisms).

is a PROB but not a PROP.

- the augmented simplex category $\Delta_+$ of natural numbers and order-preserving functions.

is an example of PRO that is not even a PROB.

== Algebras of a PRO ==
An algebra of a PRO $P$ in a monoidal category $C$ is a strict monoidal functor from $P$ to $C$. Every PRO $P$ and category $C$ give rise to a category $\mathrm{Alg}_P^C$ of algebras whose objects are the algebras of $P$ in $C$ and whose morphisms are the natural transformations between them.

For example:

- an algebra of $\mathbb{N}$ is just an object of $C$,
- an algebra of FinSet is a commutative monoid object of $C$,
- an algebra of $\Delta$ is a monoid object in $C$.

More precisely, what we mean here by "the algebras of $\Delta$ in $C$ are the monoid objects in $C$" for example is that the category of algebras of $P$ in $C$ is equivalent to the category of monoids in $C$.

== See also ==
- Lawvere theory
- Permutation category
