= Anafunctor =

Mathematical notion

In mathematics, an anafunctor (Note: The etymology of anafunctor is an analogy of the biological terms anaphase/prophase.) is a notion introduced by Makkai (1996) for ordinary categories that is a generalization of functors. In category theory, some statements require the axiom of choice, but the axiom of choice can sometimes be avoided when using an anafunctor. For example, the statement "every fully faithful and essentially surjective functor is an equivalence of categories" is equivalent to the axiom of choice, but we can usually follow the same statement without the axiom of choice by using anafunctor instead of functor.

== Definition ==
=== Span formulation of anafunctors ===
Anafunctor (span)

Let X and A be categories. An anafunctor F with domain (source) X and codomain (target) A, and between categories X and A is a category $|F|$, in a notation $F:X \xrightarrow{a} A$, is given by the following conditions:

- $F_0$ is surjective on objects.
- Let pair $F_0:|F| \rightarrow X$ and $F_1:|F| \rightarrow A$ be functors, a span of ordinary functors ($X \leftarrow |F| \rightarrow A$), where $F_0$ is fully faithful.

=== Set-theoretic definition ===
(5)

An anafunctor $F: X \xrightarrow{a} A$ following condition:

1. A set $|F|$ of specifications of $F$, with maps $\sigma : |F| \to \mathrm{Ob} (X)$ (source), $\tau : |F| \to \mathrm{Ob} (A)$ (target). $|F|$ is the set of specifications, $s \in |F|$ specifies the value $\tau (s)$ at the argument $\sigma (s)$. For $X \in \mathrm{Ob} (X)$, we write $|F| \; X$ for the class $\{s \in |F| : \sigma (s) = X\}$ and $F_{s} (X)$ for $\tau (s)$ the notation $F_{s} (X)$ presumes that $s \in |F| \; X$.
2. For each $X, \; Y \in \mathrm{Ob} (X)$, $x \in |F| \; X$, $y \in |F| \; Y$ and $f : X \to Y$ in the class of all arrows $\mathrm{Arr (X)}$ an arrows $F_{x,y} (f) : F_{x} (X) \to F_{y} (Y)$ in $A$.
3. For every $X \in \mathrm{Ob} (X)$, such that $|F| \; X$ is inhabited (non-empty).
4. $F$ hold identity. For all $X \in \mathrm{Ob} (X)$ and $x \in |F| \; X$, we have $F_{x,x} (\mathrm{id}_x) = \mathrm{id}_{F_{x}X}$
5. $F$ hold composition. Whenever $X, Y, Z \in \mathrm{Ob} (X)$, $x \in |F| \; X$, $y \in |F| \; Y$, $z \in |F| \; Z,$ and $F_{x,z} (gf) = F_{y,z} (g) \circ F_{x,y} (f)$.

== See also ==
- Profunctor

== Bibliography ==
- Makkai, M. (1996). "Avoiding the axiom of choice in general category theory". Journal of Pure and Applied Algebra. 108 (2): 109–173. doi:10.1016/0022-4049(95)00029-1.
- Makkai, M. (1998). "Towards a Categorical Foundation of Mathematics". Logic Colloquium '95: Proceedings of the Annual European Summer Meeting of the Association of Symbolic Logic, held in Haifa, Israel, August 9-18, 1995. Vol. 11. Association for Symbolic Logic. pp. 153–191. Zbl 0896.03051.
- Palmgren, Erik (2008). "Locally cartesian closed categories without chosen constructions". Theory and Applications of Categories. 20: 5–17.
- Roberts, David M. (2011). "Internal categories, anafunctors and localisations" (PDF). Theory and Application of Categories. arXiv:1101.2363.
- Schreiber, Urs; Waldorf, Konrad (2007). "Parallel Transport and Functors" (PDF). Journal of Homotopy and Related Structures. arXiv:0705.0452.
