= Skeleton (category theory) =

Mathematical construction in category theory

A skeleton of a mathematical category is a subcategory that, roughly speaking, does not contain any extraneous isomorphisms. In a certain sense, the skeleton of a category is the "smallest" equivalent category, which captures all "categorical properties" of the original. In fact, two categories are equivalent if and only if they have isomorphic skeletons. A category is called skeletal if isomorphic objects are necessarily identical.

== Definition ==
A skeleton of a category C is an equivalent category D in which isomorphic objects are equal. Typically, a skeleton is taken to be a subcategory D of C such that:

- the inclusion of D into C is full and essentially surjective, and
- D is skeletal: any two isomorphic objects of D are equal.

== Existence and uniqueness ==
It is a basic fact that every small category has a skeleton; more generally, every accessible category has a skeleton. (This is equivalent to the axiom of choice.) Also, although a category may have many distinct skeletons, any two skeletons are isomorphic as categories, so up to isomorphism of categories, the skeleton of a category is unique.

The importance of skeletons comes from the fact that they are (up to isomorphism of categories), canonical representatives of the equivalence classes of categories under the equivalence relation of equivalence of categories. This follows from the fact that any skeleton of a category C is equivalent to C, and that two categories are equivalent if and only if they have isomorphic skeletons.

== Examples ==
- The category Set of all sets has the subcategory of all cardinal numbers as a skeleton.
- The category K-Vect of all vector spaces over a fixed field $K$ has the subcategory consisting of all powers $K^{(\alpha)}$, where α is any cardinal number, as a skeleton; for any finite m and n, the maps $K^m \to K^n$ are exactly the n × m matrices with entries in K.
- FinSet, the category of all finite sets has FinOrd, the category of all finite ordinal numbers, as a skeleton.
- The category of all well-ordered sets has the subcategory of all ordinal numbers as a skeleton.
- A preorder, i.e. a small category such that for every pair of objects $A,B$, the set $\mbox{Hom}(A,B)$ either has one element or is empty, has a partially ordered set as a skeleton.
- There many examples of skeletonization of fusion categories and related structures.

== See also ==
- Glossary of category theory
- Thin category
