= Enriched category =

Category whose hom sets have algebraic structure

In category theory, a branch of mathematics, an enriched category generalizes the idea of a locally small category by replacing hom-sets with objects from a general monoidal category. It is motivated by the observation that, in many practical applications, the hom-set often has additional structure that should be respected, e.g., that of being a vector space of morphisms, or a topological space of morphisms. In an enriched category, the set of morphisms (the hom-set) associated with every pair of objects is replaced by an object in some fixed monoidal category of "hom-objects". In order to emulate the (associative) composition of morphisms in an ordinary category, the hom-category must have a means of composing hom-objects in an associative manner: that is, there must be a binary operation on objects giving us at least the structure of a monoidal category, though in some contexts the operation may also need to be commutative and perhaps also to have a right adjoint (i.e., making the category symmetric monoidal or even symmetric closed monoidal, respectively).

Enriched category theory thus encompasses within the same framework a wide variety of structures including

- ordinary categories where the hom-set carries additional structure beyond being a set. That is, there are operations on, or properties of morphisms that need to be respected by composition (e.g., the existence of 2-cells between morphisms and horizontal composition thereof in a 2-category, or the addition operation on morphisms in an abelian category)
- category-like entities that don't themselves have any notion of individual morphism but whose hom-objects have similar compositional aspects (e.g., preorders where the composition rule ensures transitivity, or Lawvere's metric spaces, where the hom-objects are numerical distances and the composition rule provides the triangle inequality).

In the case where the hom-object category happens to be the category of sets with the usual cartesian product, the definitions of enriched category, enriched functor, etc... reduce to the original definitions from ordinary category theory.

An enriched category with hom-objects from monoidal category M is said to be an enriched category over M or an enriched category in M, or simply an M-category. Due to Mac Lane's preference for the letter V in referring to the monoidal category, enriched categories are also sometimes referred to generally as V-categories.

== Definition ==
Let $(\mathbf{M},\otimes,I,\alpha,\lambda,\rho)$ be a monoidal category. Then an enriched category C (alternatively, in situations where the choice of monoidal category needs to be explicit, a category enriched over M, or M-category), consists of

- a class $\operatorname{ob}(\mathbf{C})$ of objects of C,
- an object $C(a,b)$ of M for every pair of objects a, b in C, used to define an arrow $f: a \rightarrow b$ in C as an arrow $f:I\rightarrow C(a,b)$ in M,
- an arrow $\operatorname{id}_a:I\rightarrow C(a,a)$ in M designating an identity for every object a in C, and
- an arrow $\circ_{abc}:C(b,c)\otimes C(a,b)\rightarrow C(a,c)$ in M designating a composition for each triple of objects a, b, c in C, used to define the composition of $f:a\rightarrow b$ and $g:b\rightarrow c$ in C as $g \circ_{\textbf{C}} f = {^\circ}_{abc}(g\otimes f)$ together with three commuting diagrams, discussed below.

The first diagram expresses the associativity of composition:

That is, the associativity requirement is now taken over by the associator of the monoidal category M.

For the case that M is the category of sets and (⊗, I, α, λ, ρ) is the monoidal structure (×, {•}, ...) given by the cartesian product, the terminal single-point set, and the canonical isomorphisms they induce, then each C(a, b) is a set whose elements may be thought of as "individual morphisms" of C, while °, now a function, defines how consecutive morphisms compose. In this case, each path leading to C(a, d) in the first diagram corresponds to one of the two ways of composing three consecutive individual morphisms a → b → c → d, i.e. elements from C(a, b), C(b, c) and C(c, d). Commutativity of the diagram is then merely the statement that both orders of composition give the same result, exactly as required for ordinary categories.

What is new here is that the above expresses the requirement for associativity without any explicit reference to individual morphisms in the enriched category C — again, these diagrams are for morphisms in monoidal category M, and not in C — thus making the concept of associativity of composition meaningful in the general case where the hom-objects C(a, b) are abstract, and C itself need not even have any notion of individual morphism.

The notion that an ordinary category must have identity morphisms is replaced by the second and third diagrams, which express identity in terms of left and right unitors:

and

Returning to the case where M is the category of sets with cartesian product, the morphisms id_{a}: I → C(a, a) become functions from the one-point set I and must then, for any given object a, identify a particular element of each set C(a, a), something we can then think of as the "identity morphism for a in C". Commutativity of the latter two diagrams is then the statement that compositions (as defined by the functions °) involving these distinguished individual "identity morphisms in C" behave exactly as per the identity rules for ordinary categories.

Note that there are several distinct notions of "identity" being referenced here:

- the monoidal identity object I of M, being an identity for ⊗ only in the monoid-theoretic sense, and even then only up to canonical isomorphism (λ, ρ).
- the identity morphism 1_{C(a, b)} : C(a, b) → C(a, b) that M has for each of its objects by virtue of it being (at least) an ordinary category.
- the enriched category identity id_{a} : I → C(a, a) for each object a in C, which is again a morphism of M which, even in the case where C is deemed to have individual morphisms of its own, is not necessarily identifying a specific one.

== Examples of enriched categories ==
- Ordinary categories are categories enriched over (Set, ×, {•}), the category of sets with Cartesian product as the monoidal operation, as noted above.
- 2-Categories are categories enriched over Cat, the category of small categories, with monoidal structure being given by cartesian product. In this case the 2-cells between morphisms a → b and the vertical-composition rule that relates them correspond to the morphisms of the ordinary category C(a, b) and its own composition rule.
- Locally small categories are categories enriched over (SmSet, ×), the category of small sets with Cartesian product as the monoidal operation. (A locally small category is one whose hom-objects are small sets.)
- Locally finite categories, by analogy, are categories enriched over (FinSet, ×), the category of finite sets with Cartesian product as the monoidal operation.
- If C is a closed monoidal category then C is enriched in itself.
- Preordered sets are categories enriched over a certain monoidal category, 2, consisting of two objects and a single nonidentity arrow between them that we can write as FALSE → TRUE, conjunction as the monoid operation, and TRUE as its monoidal identity. The hom-objects 2(a, b) then simply deny or affirm a particular binary relation on the given pair of objects (a, b); for the sake of having more familiar notation we can write this relation as a ≤ b. The existence of the compositions and identity required for a category enriched over 2 immediately translate to the following axioms respectively

b ≤ c and a ≤ b ⇒ a ≤ c (transitivity)
TRUE ⇒ a ≤ a (reflexivity)

which are none other than the axioms for ≤ being a preorder. And since all diagrams in 2 commute, this is the sole content of the enriched category axioms for categories enriched over 2.

- William Lawvere's generalized metric spaces, also known as pseudoquasimetric spaces, are categories enriched over the nonnegative extended real numbers R^{+∞}, where the latter is given ordinary category structure via the inverse of its usual ordering (i.e., there exists a morphism r → s iff r ≥ s) and a monoidal structure via addition (+) and zero (0). The hom-objects R^{+∞}(a, b) are essentially distances d(a, b), and the existence of composition and identity translate to

d(b, c) + d(a, b) ≥ d(a, c) (triangle inequality)
0 ≥ d(a, a)

- Categories with zero morphisms are categories enriched over (Set*, ∧), the category of pointed sets with smash product as the monoidal operation; the special point of a hom-object Hom(A, B) corresponds to the zero morphism from A to B.
- The category Ab of abelian groups and the category R-Mod of modules over a commutative ring, and the category Vect of vector spaces over a given field are enriched over themselves, where the morphisms inherit the algebraic structure "pointwise". More generally, preadditive categories are categories enriched over (Ab, ⊗) with tensor product as the monoidal operation (thinking of abelian groups as Z-modules).

== Relationship with monoidal functors ==
If there is a monoidal functor from a monoidal category M to a monoidal category N, then any category enriched over M can be reinterpreted as a category enriched over N. Every monoidal category M has a monoidal functor M(I, –) to the category of sets, so any enriched category has an underlying ordinary category. In many examples (such as those above) this functor is faithful, so a category enriched over M can be described as an ordinary category with certain additional structure or properties.

== Enriched functors ==
An enriched functor is the appropriate generalization of the notion of a functor to enriched categories. Enriched functors are then maps between enriched categories which respect the enriched structure.

If C and D are M-categories (that is, categories enriched over monoidal category M), an M-enriched functor or M-functor T: C → D is a map which assigns to each object of C an object of D and for each pair of objects a and b in C provides a morphism in M T_{ab} : C(a, b) → D(T(a), T(b)) between the hom-objects of C and D (which are objects in M), satisfying enriched versions of the axioms of a functor, viz preservation of identity and composition.

Because the hom-objects need not be sets in an enriched category, one cannot speak of a particular morphism. There is no longer any notion of an identity morphism, nor of a particular composition of two morphisms. Instead, morphisms from the unit to a hom-object should be thought of as selecting an identity, and morphisms from the monoidal product should be thought of as composition. The usual functorial axioms are replaced with corresponding commutative diagrams involving these morphisms.

In detail, one has that the diagram

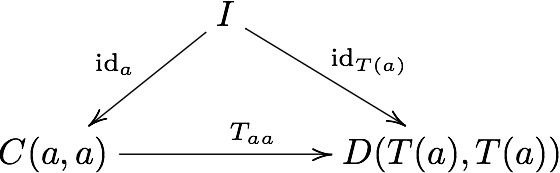

commutes, which amounts to the equation

$$T_{aa}\circ \operatorname{id}_a=\operatorname{id}_{T(a)},$$

where I is the unit object of M. This is analogous to the rule F(id_{a}) = id_{F(a)} for ordinary functors. Additionally, one demands that the diagram

commute, which is analogous to the rule F(fg)=F(f)F(g) for ordinary functors.

There is also a notion of enriched natural transformations between enriched functors, and the relationship between M-categories, M-functors, and M-natural transformations mirrors that in ordinary category theory: there is a 2-category M-cat whose objects are M-categories, (1-)morphisms are M-functors between them, and 2-morphisms are M-natural transformations between those.

== See also ==
- Internal category
- Isbell conjugacy
