= Generalized metric space =

In mathematics, specifically in category theory, a generalized metric space is a metric space but without some properties, such as symmetry. Precisely, it is a category enriched over $[0, \infty]$, the one-point compactification of $\mathbb{R}$. The notion was introduced in 1973 by William Lawvere who noticed that a metric space can be viewed as a particular kind of category.

The categorical point of view is useful since by Yoneda's lemma, a generalized metric space can be embedded into a much larger category in which, for instance, one can construct the Cauchy completion of the space.

== Discussion ==
We can view $\overline{\mathbb{R}}_+ = [0, \infty]$ as a symmetric monoidal category as follows: objects are points in $\overline{\mathbb{R}}_+$, the set of morphisms between objects $a, b$ is

$$\operatorname{Hom}(a, b) = \begin{cases}
\{ b - a \}, & \text{if } b \geq a, \\
\quad\;\varnothing, & \text{otherwise,}
\end{cases}$$

and composition $\circ: \operatorname{Hom}(b, c) \times \operatorname{Hom}(a, b) \to \operatorname{Hom}(c, a)$ is given by the sum

$$(\{ c - b \}, \{ b - a \}) \mapsto \{ c - b + b - a \}.$$

The tensor operation is $a \otimes b = a + b$.

This category structure is equivalent to one obtained by viewing the poset $(\overline{\mathbb{R}}_+, \ge)$ as a category in the usual way. The above definition is analogous to the following example: let $M$ be the Boolean algebra generated by some subsets of a finite set and with $a \to b := b \supset a$ and with $a \otimes b := a \cup b$. Then $M$ is a symmetric monoidal category.

Now, let $(X, d)$ be a metric space. Then it can be viewed as a category enriched over $\overline{\mathbb{R}}_+$ as follows. The objects are the points of $X$ and we let $\operatorname{Hom}(x, y) = d(x, y)$. The composition for $x, y, z$ is a morphism in $\overline{\mathbb{R}}_+$

$$\circ: \operatorname{Hom}(y, z) \otimes \operatorname{Hom}(x, y) \to \operatorname{Hom}(x, z)$$

and its well-definedness is exactly the triangle inequality.
