= Lawvere theory =

Concept in mathematics

In category theory, a Lawvere theory (named after American mathematician William Lawvere) is a category that can be considered a categorical counterpart of the notion of an equational theory. Intuitively, it is a categorical generalization of algebraic structures (e.g., a group or a ring), where there exists a "generic" object and all objects are isomorphic to an integer power of $x$, representing the inputs for the $n$-ary operations on $x$ (i.e., of the form $x^n \mapsto x$, starting from the fact that $x := x^1$ and so $x \circ x := x^1 \circ x^1 := x^1x^1 := x^2$; trivially generalizing inductively, we get the rest of the objects) where the operations come from the algebraic structure at hand (e.g., addition and/or multiplication).

The Lawvere theory of groups has as its generic object an underlying placeholder $x$ where the other objects are the inputs for $n$-ary operations from those integer powers of $x$ of the form ($x^n$) back to $x$, where a model, a finite-product preserving functor, from this theory into a target category $C$ such as the category of sets or topological spaces, would map the abstract theory $x$ onto the category to create a concrete, "combined," group-based structure. This model would provide a set with group structure (a group) or a topological space with group structure (a topological group), supplying appropriate names to the generic object $x$ and its mappings ($n$-ary operations) according to whatever the theory and model at play are; in the model of sets for the Lawvere theory of groups, the generic object is a group and its mappings are group operations.

== Definition ==
Let $\aleph_0$ be a skeleton of the category FinSet of finite sets and functions. Formally, a Lawvere theory consists of a small category $L$ with (strictly associative) finite products and a strict identity-on-objects functor $I:\aleph_0^\text{op}\rightarrow L$ preserving finite products.

A model of a Lawvere theory in a category $C$ with finite products is a finite-product preserving functor $M : L \rightarrow C$. A morphism of models $h : M \rightarrow N$ where $M$ and $N$ are models of $L$ is a natural transformation of functors.

== Model examples ==
Some examples of models of the Lawvere theory of groups (i.e., $L$ = $\mathbf{LawGrp}$):

- $M : L \rightarrow \mathbf{Set}$ ($M$ is a classical group)
- $M : L \rightarrow \mathbf{Top}$ ($M$ is a topological group)
- $M : L \rightarrow \mathbf{Man}$ ($M$ is a Lie group).

Some examples of models of the Lawvere theory of rings (i.e., $L$ = $\mathbf{LawRing}$):

- $M : L \rightarrow \mathbf{Set}$ ($M$ is a classical ring)
- $M : L \rightarrow \mathbf{Top}$ ($M$ is a topological ring)
- $M : L \rightarrow \mathbf{Man}$ ($M$ is a smooth ring).

== Category of Lawvere theories ==
A map between Lawvere theories $(L, I)$ and $(L', I')$ is a finite-product preserving functor that commutes with $I$ and $I'$. Such a map is commonly seen as an interpretation of $(L, I)$ in $(L', I')$.

More formally, a map $K : (L, I) \rightarrow (L', I')$, such that $K \circ I = I'$, where $I(n) = x^n_{L}$ and $(K \circ I)(n) = I'(n) = x^n_{L'}$.

Lawvere theories together with maps between them form the category $\mathbf{Law}$.

== Variations ==
Variations include multisorted (or multityped) Lawvere theory, infinitary Lawvere theory, and finite-product theory.

== See also ==
- Algebraic theory
- Clone (algebra)
- Monad (category theory)
