= Universal algebra =

Theory of algebraic structures in general

Universal algebra (sometimes called general algebra) is the field of mathematics that studies algebraic structures in general, not specific types of algebraic structures. For instance, rather than considering groups or rings as the object of study—this is the subject of group theory and ring theory—in universal algebra, the object of study is the possible types of algebraic structures and their relationships.

== Basic idea ==
In universal algebra, an algebra (or algebraic structure) is a set A together with a collection of operations on A.

=== Arity ===
An n-ary operation on A is a function that takes n elements of A and returns a single element of A. Thus, a 0-ary operation (or nullary operation) can be represented simply as an element of A, or a constant, often denoted by a letter like a. A 1-ary operation (or unary operation) is simply a function from A to A, often denoted by a symbol placed in front of its argument, like ~x. A 2-ary operation (or binary operation) is often denoted by a symbol placed between its arguments (also called infix notation), like x ∗ y. Operations of higher or unspecified arity are usually denoted by function symbols, with the arguments placed in parentheses and separated by commas, like f(x,y,z) or f(x_{1},...,x_{n}). One way of talking about an algebra, then, is by referring to it as an algebra of a certain type Ω, where Ω is an ordered sequence of natural numbers representing the arity of the operations of the algebra. However, some researchers also allow infinitary operations, such as $\textstyle\bigwedge_{\alpha\in J} x_\alpha$ where J is an infinite index set, which is an operation in the algebraic theory of complete lattices.

== Varieties ==
Collections (classes) of algebraic structures are often defined by axioms, which in universal algebra often take the form of identities, or equational laws. An example is the associative axiom for a binary operation, which is given by the equation x ∗ (y ∗ z) = (x ∗ y) ∗ z. The axiom is intended to hold for all elements x, y, and z of the set A.

A collection of algebraic structures defined by identities is called a variety or equational class.

Restricting one's study to varieties rules out:

- quantification, including universal quantification (∀) except before an equation, and existential quantification (∃)
- logical connectives other than conjunction (∧)
- relations other than equality, in particular inequalities, both a ≠ b and order relations

The study of equational classes can be seen as a special branch of model theory, typically dealing with structures having operations only (i.e. the type can have symbols for functions but not for relations other than equality), and in which the language used to talk about these structures uses equations only.

Not all algebraic structures in a wider sense fall into this scope. For example, ordered groups involve an ordering relation, so would not fall within this scope.

The class of fields is not an equational class because there is no type (or "signature") in which all field laws can be written as equations (inverses of elements are defined for all non-zero elements in a field, so inversion cannot be added to the type).

One advantage of this restriction is that the structures studied in universal algebra can be defined in any category that has finite products. For example, a topological group is just a group in the category of topological spaces.

=== Examples ===
Most of the usual algebraic systems of mathematics are examples of varieties, but not always in an obvious way, since the usual definitions often involve quantification or inequalities.

==== Groups ====
As an example, consider the definition of a group. Usually a group is defined in terms of a single binary operation ∗, subject to the axioms:

- Associativity (as in the previous section): x ∗ (y ∗ z) = (x ∗ y) ∗ z; formally: ∀x,y,z. x∗(y∗z)=(x∗y)∗z.
- Identity element: There exists an element e such that for each element x, one has e ∗ x = x = x ∗ e; formally: ∃e ∀x. e∗x=x=x∗e.
- Inverse element: The identity element is easily seen to be unique, and is usually denoted by e. Then for each x, there exists an element i such that x ∗ i = e = i ∗ x; formally: ∀x ∃i. x∗i=e=i∗x.

(Some authors also use the "closure" axiom that x ∗ y belongs to A whenever x and y do, but here this is already implied by calling ∗ a binary operation.)

This definition of a group does not immediately fit the point of view of universal algebra, because the axioms of the identity element and inversion are not stated purely in terms of equational laws which hold universally "for all ..." elements, but also involve the existential quantifier "there exists ...". The group axioms can be phrased as universally quantified equations by specifying, in addition to the binary operation ∗, a nullary operation e and a unary operation ~, with ~x usually written as x^{−1}. The axioms become:

- Associativity: x ∗ (y ∗ z) = (x ∗ y) ∗ z.
- Identity element: e ∗ x = x = x ∗ e.
- Inverse element: x ∗ (~x) = e = (~x) ∗ x.

To summarize, the usual definition has:

- a single binary operation (signature (2))
- 1 equational law (associativity)
- 2 quantified laws (identity and inverse)

while the universal algebra definition has:

- 3 operations: one binary, one unary, and one nullary (signature (2, 1, 0))
- 3 equational laws (associativity, identity, and inverse)
- no quantified laws (except outermost universal quantifiers, which are universally implied for all variables in varieties)

A key point is that the extra operations do not add information, but follow uniquely from the usual definition of a group. Although the usual definition did not uniquely specify the identity element e, an easy exercise shows that it is unique, as is the inverse of each element.

The universal algebra point of view is well adapted to category theory. For example, when defining a group object in category theory, where the object in question may not be a set, one must use equational laws (which make sense in general categories), rather than quantified laws (which refer to individual elements). Further, the inverse and identity are specified as morphisms in the category. For example, in a topological group, the inverse must not only exist element-wise, but must give a continuous mapping (a morphism). Some authors also require the identity map to be a closed inclusion (a cofibration).

==== Other examples ====
Most algebraic structures are examples of universal algebras.

- Rings, semigroups, quasigroups, groupoids, magmas, loops, and others.
- Vector spaces over a fixed field and modules over a fixed ring are universal algebras. These have a binary addition and a family of unary scalar multiplication operators, one for each element of the field or ring.

Examples of relational algebras include semilattices, lattices, and Boolean algebras.

== Basic constructions ==
We assume that the type, Ω, has been fixed. Then there are three basic constructions in universal algebra: homomorphic image, subalgebra, and product.

A homomorphism between two algebras A and B is a function h : A → B from the set A to the set B such that, for every operation f_{A} of A and corresponding f_{B} of B (of arity, say, n), h(f_{A}(x_{1}, ..., x_{n})) = f_{B}(h(x_{1}), ..., h(x_{n})). (Sometimes the subscripts on f are taken off when it is clear from context which algebra the function is from.) For example, if e is a constant (nullary operation), then h(e_{A}) = e_{B}. If ~ is a unary operation, then h(~x) = ~h(x). If ∗ is a binary operation, then h(x ∗ y) = h(x) ∗ h(y). And so on. A few of the things that can be done with homomorphisms, as well as definitions of certain special kinds of homomorphisms, are listed under Homomorphism. In particular, we can take the homomorphic image of an algebra, h(A).

A subalgebra of A is a subset of A that is closed under all the operations of A. A product of some set of algebraic structures is the cartesian product of the sets with the operations defined coordinatewise.

== Some basic theorems ==
- The isomorphism theorems, which encompass the isomorphism theorems of groups, rings, modules, etc.
- Birkhoff's HSP Theorem, which states that a class of algebras is a variety if and only if it is closed under homomorphic images, subalgebras, and arbitrary direct products.

== Motivations and applications ==
In addition to its unifying approach, universal algebra also gives deep theorems and important examples and counterexamples. It provides a useful framework for those who intend to start the study of new classes of algebras. It can enable the use of methods invented for some particular classes of algebras to other classes of algebras, by recasting the methods in terms of universal algebra (if possible), and then interpreting these as applied to other classes. It has also provided conceptual clarification; as J.D.H. Smith puts it, "What looks messy and complicated in a particular framework may turn out to be simple and obvious in the proper general one."

In particular, universal algebra can be applied to the study of monoids, rings, and lattices. Before universal algebra came along, many theorems (most notably the isomorphism theorems) were proved separately in all of these classes, but with universal algebra, they can be proven once and for all for every kind of algebraic system.

A 1956 paper by Higgins constructed a framework for a range of particular algebraic systems. His 1963 paper is notable for its discussion of algebras with partial operations, typical examples for this being categories and groupoids. A further generalization is the subject of higher-dimensional algebra which can be defined as the study of algebraic theories with partial operations whose domains are defined under geometric conditions. Notable examples of these are various forms of higher-dimensional categories and groupoids.

=== Constraint satisfaction problem ===
Universal algebra provides a natural language for the constraint satisfaction problem (CSP). CSP refers to an important class of computational problems where, given a relational algebra A and an existential sentence ϕ over this algebra, the question is to find out whether ϕ can be satisfied in A. The algebra A is often fixed, so that CSP_{A} refers to the problem whose instance is only the existential sentence ϕ.

It is proved that every computational problem can be formulated as CSP_{A} for some algebra A.

For example, the n-coloring problem can be stated as CSP of the algebra ({0, 1, ..., n−1}, ≠), i.e. an algebra with n elements and a single relation, inequality.

== Generalizations ==
Universal algebra has also been studied using the techniques of category theory. In this approach, instead of writing a list of operations and equations obeyed by those operations, one can describe an algebraic structure using categories of a special sort, known as Lawvere theories or more generally algebraic theories. Alternatively, one can describe algebraic structures using monads. The two approaches are closely related, with each having their own advantages. In particular, every Lawvere theory gives a monad on the category of sets, while any "finitary" monad on the category of sets arises from a Lawvere theory. However, a monad describes algebraic structures within one particular category (for example the category of sets), while algebraic theories describe structure within any of a large class of categories (namely those having finite products).

A more recent development in category theory is operad theory – an operad is a set of operations, similar to a universal algebra, but restricted in that equations are only allowed between expressions with the variables, with no duplication or omission of variables allowed. Thus, rings can be described as the so-called "algebras" of some operad, but not groups, since the law gg^{−1} = 1 duplicates the variable g on the left side and omits it on the right side. At first this may seem to be a troublesome restriction, but the payoff is that operads have certain advantages: for example, one can hybridize the concepts of ring and vector space to obtain the concept of associative algebra, but one cannot form a similar hybrid of the concepts of group and vector space.

Another development is partial algebra where the operators can be partial functions. Certain partial functions can also be handled by a generalization of Lawvere theories known as "essentially algebraic theories".

Another generalization of universal algebra is model theory, which is sometimes described as "universal algebra + logic".

== History ==
In Alfred North Whitehead's book A Treatise on Universal Algebra, published in 1898, the term universal algebra had essentially the same meaning that it has today. Whitehead credits William Rowan Hamilton and Augustus De Morgan as originators of the subject matter, and James Joseph Sylvester with coining the term itself.

At the time structures such as Lie algebras and hyperbolic quaternions drew attention to the need to expand algebraic structures beyond the associatively multiplicative class. In a review Alexander Macfarlane wrote: "The main idea of the work is not unification of the several methods, nor generalization of ordinary algebra so as to include them, but rather the comparative study of their several structures." At the time George Boole's algebra of logic made a strong counterpoint to ordinary number algebra, so the term "universal" served to calm strained sensibilities.

Whitehead's early work sought to unify quaternions (due to Hamilton), Grassmann's Ausdehnungslehre, and Boole's algebra of logic. Whitehead wrote in his book:

"Such algebras have an intrinsic value for separate detailed study; also they are worthy of comparative study, for the sake of the light thereby thrown on the general theory of symbolic reasoning, and on algebraic symbolism in particular. The comparative study necessarily presupposes some previous separate study, comparison being impossible without knowledge."

Whitehead, however, had no results of a general nature. Work on the subject was minimal until the early 1930s, when Garrett Birkhoff and Øystein Ore began publishing on universal algebras. Developments in metamathematics and category theory in the 1940s and 1950s furthered the field, particularly the work of Abraham Robinson, Alfred Tarski, Andrzej Mostowski, and their students.

In the period between 1935 and 1950, most papers were written along the lines suggested by Birkhoff's papers, dealing with free algebras, congruence and subalgebra lattices, and homomorphism theorems. Although the development of mathematical logic had made applications to algebra possible, they came about slowly; results published by Anatoly Maltsev in the 1940s went unnoticed because of the war. Tarski's lecture at the 1950 International Congress of Mathematicians in Cambridge ushered in a new period in which model-theoretic aspects were developed, mainly by Tarski himself, as well as Chen Chung Chang, Leon Henkin, Bjarni Jónsson, Roger Lyndon, and others.

In the late 1950s, Edward Marczewski emphasized the importance of free algebras, leading to the publication of more than 50 papers on the algebraic theory of free algebras by Marczewski himself, together with Jan Mycielski, Władysław Narkiewicz, Witold Nitka, J. Płonka, S. Świerczkowski, K. Urbanik, and others.

Survey textbooks appeared in the 1960s from Bernhard Neumann (1962), Paul Cohn (1965), George Grätzer (1967) and Richard S. Pierce (1968). Starting with William Lawvere's thesis in 1963, techniques from category theory have become important in universal algebra.

== See also ==
- Equational logic
- Graph algebra
- Term algebra
- Clone
- Universal algebraic geometry
- Simple algebra (universal algebra)
