= Sum of residues formula =

In mathematics, the residue formula says that the sum of the residues of a meromorphic differential form on a smooth proper algebraic curve vanishes.

== Statement ==
In this article, X denotes a proper smooth algebraic curve over a field k. A meromorphic (algebraic) differential form $\omega$ has, at each closed point x in X, a residue which is denoted $\operatorname{res}_x \omega$. Since $\omega$ has poles only at finitely many points, in particular the residue vanishes for all but finitely many points. The residue formula states:

$$\sum_{x} \operatorname{res}_x \omega=0.$$

== Proofs ==
A geometric way of proving the theorem is by reducing the theorem to the case when X is the projective line, and proving it by explicit computations in this case, for example in Altman & Kleiman (1970, Ch. VIII, p. 177).

Tate (1968) proves the theorem using a notion of traces for certain endomorphisms of infinite-dimensional vector spaces. The residue of a differential form $f dg$ can be expressed in terms of traces of endomorphisms on the fraction field $K_x$ of the completed local rings $\hat \mathcal O_{X, x}$ which leads to a conceptual proof of the formula. A more recent exposition along similar lines, using more explicitly the notion of Tate vector spaces, is given by Clausen (2009).
