= Isomorphism-closed subcategory =

In category theory, a branch of mathematics, a subcategory $\mathcal{A}$ of a category $\mathcal{B}$ is said to be isomorphism closed or replete if every $\mathcal{B}$-isomorphism $h:A\to B$ with $A\in\mathcal{A}$ belongs to $\mathcal{A}.$ This implies that both $B$ and $h^{-1}:B\to A$ belong to $\mathcal{A}$ as well.

A subcategory that is isomorphism closed and full is called strictly full. In the case of full subcategories it is sufficient to check that every $\mathcal{B}$-object that is isomorphic to an $\mathcal{A}$-object is also an $\mathcal{A}$-object.

This condition is very natural. For example, in the category of topological spaces one usually studies properties that are invariant under homeomorphisms—so-called topological properties. Every topological property corresponds to a strictly full subcategory of $\mathbf{Top}.$
