= Tate vector space =

In mathematics, a Tate vector space is a vector space obtained from finite-dimensional vector spaces in a way that makes it possible to extend concepts such as dimension and determinant to an infinite-dimensional situation. Tate spaces were introduced by Alexander Beilinson, Boris Feigin, and Barry Mazur (1991), who named them after John Tate.

== Introduction ==
A typical example of a Tate vector space over a field k are the Laurent power series

$$V = k(\!(t)\!). \,$$

It has two characteristic features:

- as n grows, V is the union of its submodules $t^{-n} k[[t]]$, where $k[[t]]$ denotes the power series ring. These submodules are referred to as lattices.
- Even though each lattice is an infinite-dimensional vector space, the quotients of any individual lattices,

$$t^{-n} k[[t]] / t^{-m} k[[t]], \ n \ge m$$

are finite-dimensional k-vector spaces.

=== Tate modules ===
Tate modules were introduced by Drinfeld (2006) to serve as a notion of infinite-dimensional vector bundles. For any ring R, Drinfeld defined elementary Tate modules to be topological R-modules of the form

$$P \oplus Q^*$$

where P and Q are projective R-modules (of possibly infinite rank) and * denotes the dual.

For a field, Tate vector spaces in this sense are equivalent to locally linearly compact vector spaces, a concept going back to Lefschetz. These are characterized by the property that they have a base of the topology consisting of commensurable sub-vector spaces.

== Tate objects ==
Tate objects can be defined in the context of any exact category C. Briefly, an exact category is way to axiomatize certain features of short exact sequences. For example, the category of finite-dimensional k-vector spaces, or the category of finitely generated projective R-modules, for some ring R, is an exact category, with its usual notion of short exact sequences.

The extension of the above example $k(\!(t)\!)$ to a more general situation is based on the following observation: there is an exact sequence

$$0 \to k[[t]] \to k((t)) \to t^{-1} k[t^{-1}] \to 0$$

whose outer terms are an inverse limit and a direct limit, respectively, of finite-dimensional k-vector spaces

$$k[[t]] = \lim_n k[t]/t^n$$
$$t^{-1} k[t^{-1}] = \operatorname{colim}_m \bigoplus_{i=-1}^{-m} t^i \cdot k.$$

In general, for an exact category C, there is the category Pro(C) of pro-objects and the category Ind(C) of ind-objects. This construction can be iterated and yields an exact category Ind(Pro(C)). The category of elementary Tate objects

$$\operatorname{Tate}^\text{el}(C)$$

is defined to be the smallest subcategory of those Ind-Pro objects V such that there is a short exact sequence

$$0 \to L \to V \to L' \to 0$$

where L is a pro-object and L' is an ind-object. It can be shown that this condition on V is equivalent to that requiring for an ind-presentation

$$V: I \to \operatorname{Pro}(C)$$

the quotients $V_j / V_i$ are in C (as opposed to Pro(C)).

The category Tate(C) of Tate objects is defined to be the closure under retracts (idempotent completion) of elementary Tate objects.

Braunling, Groechenig & Wolfson (2016) showed that Tate objects (for C the category of finitely generated projective R-modules, and subject to the condition that the indexing families of the Ind-Pro objects are countable) are equivalent to countably generated Tate R-modules in the sense of Drinfeld mentioned above.

== Related notions and applications ==
A Tate Lie algebra is a Tate vector space with an additional Lie algebra structure. An example of a Tate Lie algebra is the Lie algebra of formal power series over a finite-dimensional Lie algebra.

The category of Tate objects is an exact category, as well, as can be shown. The construction can therefore be iterated, which is relevant to applications in higher-dimensional class field theory, which studies higher local fields such as

$$\mathbf F_p((t_1))\cdots((t_n)).$$

Kapranov (2001) has introduced the so-called determinant torsor for Tate vector spaces, which extends the usual linear algebra notions of determinants and traces etc. to automorphisms f of Tate vector spaces V. The essential idea is that, even though a lattice L in V is infinite-dimensional, the lattices L and f(L) are commensurable, so that the ? in the finite-dimensional sense can be uniquely extended to all lattices, provided that the determinant of one lattice is fixed. Clausen (2009) has applied this torsor to simultaneously prove the Riemann–Roch theorem, Weil reciprocity and the sum of residues formula. The latter formula was already proved by Tate (1968) by similar means.
