= FinSet =

Category whose objects are finite sets and whose morphisms are functions

In the mathematical field of category theory, FinSet is the category whose objects are all finite sets and whose morphisms are all functions between them. FinOrd is the category whose objects are all finite ordinal numbers and whose morphisms are all functions between them.

== Properties ==
FinSet is a full subcategory of Set, the category whose objects are all sets and whose morphisms are all functions. Like Set, FinSet is a large category.

FinOrd is a full subcategory of FinSet as by the standard definition, suggested by John von Neumann, each ordinal is the well-ordered set of all smaller ordinals. Unlike Set and FinSet, FinOrd is a small category.

FinOrd is a skeleton of FinSet. Therefore, FinSet and FinOrd are equivalent categories.

== Topoi ==
Like Set, FinSet and FinOrd are topoi. As in Set, in FinSet the categorical product of two objects A and B is given by the cartesian product A × B, the categorical sum is given by the disjoint union A + B, and the exponential object B^{A} is given by the set of all functions with domain A and codomain B. In FinOrd, the categorical product of two objects n and m is given by the ordinal product n · m, the categorical sum is given by the ordinal sum n + m, and the exponential object is given by the ordinal exponentiation n^{m}. The subobject classifier in FinSet and FinOrd is the same as in Set. FinOrd is an example of a PRO.

== See also ==
- General set theory
- Lawvere theory
- Natural number object
- Simplex category
- FinVect
