= Elementary theory =

Mathematical logic

In mathematical logic, an elementary theory is a theory that involves axioms using only finitary first-order logic, without reference to set theory or using any axioms that have consistency strength equal to set theory.

Saying that a theory is elementary is a weaker condition than saying it is algebraic.

== Examples ==
Examples of elementary theories include:

- The theory of groups
  - The theory of finite groups
  - The theory of abelian groups
- The theory of fields
  - The theory of finite fields
  - The theory of real closed fields
- Axiomization of Euclidean geometry

== Related ==
- Elementary definition
- Elementary theory of the reals
