= Structural set theory =

In mathematics, a structural set theory is an approach to set theory that emphasizes the aspect of sets as abstract structures. It is in contrast to a more traditional ZFC set-theory, which emphasizes membership. A prime example is Lawvere's Elementary Theory of the Category of Sets, which identifies sets in terms of relations to each other through functions. Another example is SEAR (Sets, Elements, And Relations).

The adjective "structural" comes from the structuralism in the philosophy of mathematics.
