= Elementary definition =

In mathematical logic, an elementary definition is a definition that can be made using only finitary first-order logic, and in particular without reference to set theory or using extensions such as plural quantification. Elementary definitions are of particular interest because they admit a complete proof apparatus while still being expressive enough to support most everyday mathematics (via the addition of elementarily-expressible axioms such as Zermelo–Fraenkel set theory (ZFC)).

Saying that a definition is elementary is a weaker condition than saying it is algebraic.

== Related ==
- Elementary theory
