= Universal algebraic geometry =

In algebraic geometry, universal algebraic geometry generalizes the geometry of rings to geometries of arbitrary varieties of algebras, so that every variety of algebras has its own algebraic geometry. The two terms algebraic variety and variety of algebras should not be confused.

== See also ==
- Algebraic geometry
- Universal algebra
