= Completions in category theory =

In category theory, a branch of mathematics, there are several ways (completions) to enlarge a given category in a way somehow analogous to a completion in topology. These are (ignoring the set-theoretic matters for simplicity):

- free cocompletion, free completion. These are obtained by freely adding colimits or limits. Explicitly, the free cocompletion of a category C is the Yoneda embedding of C into the category of presheaves on C. The free completion of C is the free cocompletion of the opposite of C.
  - ind-completion. This is obtained by freely adding filtered colimits.
- Cauchy completion of a category C is roughly the closure of C in some ambient category so that all functors preserve limits. For example, if a metric space is viewed as an enriched category (see generalized metric space), then the Cauchy completion of it coincides with the usual completion of the space.
- Isbell completion (also called reflexive completion), introduced by Isbell in 1960, is in short the fixed-point category of the Isbell conjugacy adjunction. It should not be confused with the Isbell envelope, which was also introduced by Isbell.
- Karoubi envelope or idempotent completion of a category C is (roughly) the universal enlargement of C so that every idempotent is a split idempotent.
- Exact completion
