= Permutation category =

Type of mathematical category

In category theory, a branch of mathematics, the permutation category is the category where

1. the objects are the natural numbers,
2. the morphisms from a natural number n to itself are the elements of the symmetric group $S_n$ and
3. there are no morphisms from m to n if $m\neq n$.

It is equivalent as a category to the category of finite sets and bijections between them.
