= Isomorphism of categories =

Relation of categories in category theory

In category theory, two categories C and D are isomorphic if there exist functors F : C → D and G : D → C that are mutually inverse to each other, i.e. FG = 1_{D} (the identity functor on D) and GF = 1_{C}. This means that both the objects and the morphisms of C and D stand in a one-to-one correspondence with each other. Two isomorphic categories share all properties defined solely in category theory; for all practical purposes, they are identical and differ only in the notation of their objects and morphisms.

Isomorphism of categories is a strong condition and is rarely satisfied in practice. Much more important is the notion of equivalence of categories; roughly speaking, for an equivalence of categories, we don't require that $FG$ be equal to $1_D$, but only naturally isomorphic to $1_D$, and likewise that $GF$ be naturally isomorphic to $1_C$.

== Properties ==
As is true for any notion of isomorphism, we have the following general properties formally similar to an equivalence relation:

- any category C is isomorphic to itself
- if C is isomorphic to D, then D is isomorphic to C
- if C is isomorphic to D and D is isomorphic to E, then C is isomorphic to E.

A functor F : C → D yields an isomorphism of categories if and only if it is bijective on objects and morphism sets. This criterion can be convenient as it avoids constructing the inverse functor G.

== Examples ==
- Consider a finite group G, a field k and the group algebra kG. The category of k-linear group representations of G is isomorphic to the category of left modules over kG. The isomorphism can be described as follows: given a group representation ρ : G → GL(V), where V is a vector space over k, GL(V) is the group of its k-linear automorphisms, and ρ is a group homomorphism, we turn V into a left kG module by defining
  $$\left(\sum_{g\in G} a_g g\right) v = \sum_{g\in G} a_g \rho(g)(v)$$
  for every v in V and every element Σ a_{g} g in kG.
  Conversely, given a left kG module M, then M is a k vector space, and multiplication with an element g of G yields a k-linear automorphism of M (since g is invertible in kG), which describes a group homomorphism G → GL(M). (There are still several things to check: both these assignments are functors, i.e. they can be applied to maps between group representations resp. kG modules, and they are inverse to each other, both on objects and on morphisms.) See also Representation theory of finite groups § Representations, modules and the convolution algebra.
- Every ring can be viewed as a preadditive category with a single object. The functor category of all additive functors from this category to the category of abelian groups is isomorphic to the category of left modules over the ring.
- Another isomorphism of categories arises in the Boolean algebras theory: Boolean algebras is isomorphic to the category of Boolean rings. Given a Boolean algebra B, we turn B into a Boolean ring by using the symmetric difference as addition and the meet operation $\land$ as multiplication. Conversely, given a Boolean ring R, we define the join operation by a$\lor$b = a + b + ab, and the meet operation as multiplication. Again, both of these assignments can be extended to morphisms to yield functors, which are inverse to each other.
- If C is a category with an initial object s, then the slice category (s↓C) is isomorphic to C. Dually, if t is a terminal object in C, the functor category (C↓t) is isomorphic to C. Similarly, if 1 is the category with one object and only its identity morphism (in fact, 1 is the terminal category), and C is any category, then the functor category C^{1}, with objects functors c: 1 → C, selecting an object c∈Ob(C), and arrows natural transformations f: c → d between these functors, selecting a morphism f: c → d in C, is again isomorphic to C.
