= ProP (transporter) =

Proline/betaine transporter

Identifiers
- Organism: Escherichia coli
- Symbol: ProP
- Orthologs: OMA: entry
- PDB: 1R48
- UniProt: P0C0L7
Search for
- Structures: Swiss-model
- Domains: InterPro

ProP is a bacterial membrane protein that is a member of the major facilitator superfamily. It functions as an osmosensory and osmoregulatory transporter, responding to changes in osmotic pressure by importing compatible solutes such as proline or glycine betaine; most substrates for ProP are zwitterions. The activity of ProP increases with osmotic pressure in cells and proteoliposomes. ProP is a symporter of hydrogen ions and compatible solutes, and is responsive to potassium concentrations.

Activity of ProP has been associated with the ability of pathogenic E. coli to colonize the urinary tract.
