= Algebraic theory =

Informally in mathematical logic, an algebraic theory is a theory that uses axioms stated entirely in terms of equations between terms with free variables. Inequalities and quantifiers are specifically disallowed. Sentential logic is the subset of first-order logic involving only algebraic sentences.

The notion is very close to the notion of algebraic structure, which, arguably, may be just a synonym.

Saying that a theory is algebraic is a stronger condition than saying it is elementary.

== Informal interpretation ==
An algebraic theory consists of a collection of n-ary operation symbols with additional rules (axioms).

For example, the theory of groups is an algebraic theory because it has three operation symbols: a binary operation a × b, a nullary operation 1 (neutral element), and a unary operation x ↦ x^{−1} with the rules of associativity, neutrality and inverses respectively. Other examples include:

- the theory of semigroups
- the theory of lattices
- the theory of rings

This is opposed to geometric theories, which involve partial functions (or binary relationships) or existential quantifiers—see e.g. Euclidean geometry, where the existence of points or lines is postulated.

== Category-based model-theoretical interpretation ==
In category theory, an algebraic theory T is a category whose objects are natural numbers 0, 1, 2,..., and which, for each n, has an n-tuple of morphisms:

proj_{i}: n → 1, i = 1, ..., n

This allows interpreting n as a cartesian product of n copies of 1.

Example: Let's define an algebraic theory T taking hom(n, m) to be m-tuples of polynomials of n free variables X_{1}, ..., X_{n} with integer coefficients and with substitution as composition. In this case proj_{i} is equal to X_{i}. This theory T is called the theory of commutative rings.

In an algebraic theory, any morphism n → m can be described as m morphisms of signature n → 1. These latter morphisms are called n-ary operations of the theory.

If E is a category with finite products, the full subcategory Alg(T, E) of the category of functors [T, E] consisting of those functors that preserve finite products is called the category of T-models or T-algebras.

Note that for the case of a morphism 2 → 1, the appropriate algebra A will define a morphism

A(2) ≈ A(1) × A(1) → A(1).

== See also ==
- Clone (algebra)
