= Elementary theory of the category of sets =

Set of axioms for set theory

In mathematics, the elementary theory of the category of sets or ETCS is a set of axioms for set theory proposed by William Lawvere in 1964. Although it was originally stated in the language of category theory, as Tom Leinster pointed out, the axioms can be stated without references to category theory.

ETCS is a basic example of structural set theory, an approach to set theory that emphasizes sets as abstract structures (as opposed to collections of elements).

== Axioms ==
The real message is this: simply by writing down a few mundane, uncontroversial statements about sets and functions, we arrive at an axiomatization that reflects how sets are used in everyday mathematics.

— Tom Leinster,

Informally, the axioms are as follows: (here, set, function and composition of functions are primitives)

1. Composition of functions is associative and has identities.
2. There is a set with exactly one element.
3. There is an empty set.
4. A function is determined by its effect on elements.
5. A Cartesian product exists for a pair of sets.
6. Given sets $X$ and $Y$, there is a set of all functions from $X$ to $Y$.
7. Given $f : X \to Y$ and an element $y \in Y$, the pre-image $f^{-1}(y)$ is defined.
8. The subsets of a set $X$ correspond to the functions $X \to \{0, 1\}$.
9. The natural numbers form a set.
10. (weak axiom of choice) Every surjection has a right inverse (i.e., a section).

The resulting theory is weaker than ZFC. If the axiom schema of replacement is added as another axiom, the resulting theory is equivalent to ZFC.

== See also ==
- Mac Lane set theory
