= Essentially surjective functor =

In mathematics, specifically in category theory, a functor

$$F:C\to D$$

is essentially surjective if each object $d$ of $D$ is isomorphic to an object of the form $Fc$ for some object $c$ of $C$.

Any functor that is part of an equivalence of categories is essentially surjective. As a partial converse, any full and faithful functor that is essentially surjective is part of an equivalence of categories.
