= Equivalence of categories =

Abstract mathematics relationship

In category theory, a branch of abstract mathematics, an equivalence of categories is a relation between two categories that establishes that these categories are "essentially the same". There are numerous examples of categorical equivalences from many areas of mathematics. Establishing an equivalence involves demonstrating strong similarities between the mathematical structures concerned. In some cases, these structures may appear to be unrelated at a superficial or intuitive level, making the notion fairly powerful: it creates the opportunity to "translate" theorems between different kinds of mathematical structures, knowing that the essential meaning of those theorems is preserved under the translation.

If a category is equivalent to the opposite (or dual) of another category then one speaks of a duality of categories, and says that the two categories are dually equivalent.

An equivalence of categories consists of a functor between the involved categories, which is required to have an "inverse" functor. However, in contrast to the situation common for isomorphisms in an algebraic setting, the composite of the functor and its "inverse" is not necessarily the identity mapping. Instead it is sufficient that each object be naturally isomorphic to its image under this composition. Thus one may describe the functors as being "inverse up to isomorphism". There is indeed a concept of isomorphism of categories where a strict form of inverse functor is required, but this is of much less practical use than equivalence.

== Definition ==
Formally, given two categories C and D, an equivalence of categories consists of a functor F : C → D, a functor G : D → C, and two natural isomorphisms ε: FG→I_{D} and η : I_{C}→GF. Here FG: D→D and GF: C→C denote the respective compositions of F and G, and I_{C}: C→C and I_{D}: D→D denote the identity functors on C and D, assigning each object and morphism to itself. If F and G are contravariant functors one speaks of a duality of categories instead.

One often does not specify all the above data. For instance, we say that the categories C and D are equivalent (respectively dually equivalent) if there exists an equivalence (respectively duality) between them. Furthermore, we say that F "is" an equivalence of categories if an inverse functor G and natural isomorphisms as above exist. Note however that knowledge of F is usually not enough to reconstruct G and the natural isomorphisms: there may be many choices (see example below).

== Alternative characterizations ==
A functor F : C → D yields an equivalence of categories if and only if it is simultaneously:

- full, i.e. for any two objects c_{1} and c_{2} of C, the map Hom_{C}(c_{1},c_{2}) → Hom_{D}(Fc_{1},Fc_{2}) induced by F is surjective;
- faithful, i.e. for any two objects c_{1} and c_{2} of C, the map Hom_{C}(c_{1},c_{2}) → Hom_{D}(Fc_{1},Fc_{2}) induced by F is injective; and
- essentially surjective (dense), i.e. each object d in D is isomorphic to an object of the form Fc, for c in C.

This is a quite useful and commonly applied criterion, because one does not have to explicitly construct the "inverse" G and the natural isomorphisms between FG, GF and the identity functors. On the other hand, though the above properties guarantee the existence of a categorical equivalence (Given a sufficiently strong version of the axiom of choice in the underlying set theory. By using anafunctors instead of ordinary functors, this statement can be hold without using the AC. For categories other than ordinary categories, AC is still required for strict categories, the statement fails even if AC is assumed for precategories, and AC is not required for the proof for saturated categories. ), the missing data is not completely specified, and often there are many choices. It is a good idea to specify the missing constructions explicitly whenever possible. Due to this circumstance, a functor with these properties is sometimes called a weak equivalence of categories. (Unfortunately this conflicts with terminology from homotopy theory.)

There is also a close relation to the concept of adjoint functors $F\dashv G$, where we say that $F:C\rightarrow D$ is the left adjoint of $G:D\rightarrow C$, or likewise, G is the right adjoint of F. Then C and D are equivalent (as defined above in that there are natural isomorphisms from FG to I_{D} and I_{C} to GF) if and only if $F\dashv G$ and both F and G are full and faithful.

When adjoint functors $F\dashv G$ are not both full and faithful, then we may view their adjointness relation as expressing a "weaker form of equivalence" of categories. Assuming that the natural transformations for the adjunctions are given, all of these formulations allow for an explicit construction of the necessary data, and no choice principles are needed. The key property that one has to prove here is that the counit of an adjunction is an isomorphism if and only if the right adjoint is a full and faithful functor.

== Examples ==
- Consider the category $C$ having a single object $c$ and a single morphism $1_{c}$, and the category $D$ with two objects $d_{1}$, $d_{2}$ and four morphisms: two identity morphisms $1_{d_{1}}$, $1_{d_{2}}$ and two isomorphisms $\alpha \colon d_{1} \to d_{2}$ and $\beta \colon d_{2} \to d_{1}$. The categories $C$ and $D$ are equivalent; we can (for example) have $F$ map $c$ to $d_{1}$ and $G$ map both objects of $D$ to $c$ and all morphisms to $1_{c}$.
- By contrast, the category $C$ with a single object and a single morphism is not equivalent to the category $E$ with two objects and only two identity morphisms. The two objects in $E$ are not isomorphic in that there are no morphisms between them. Thus any functor from $C$ to $E$ will not be essentially surjective.
- Consider a category $C$ with one object $c$, and two morphisms $1_{c}, f \colon c \to c$. Let $1_{c}$ be the identity morphism on $c$ and set $f \circ f = 1$. Of course, $C$ is equivalent to itself, which can be shown by taking $1_{c}$ in place of the required natural isomorphisms between the functor $\mathbf{I}_{C}$ and itself. However, it is also true that $f$ yields a natural isomorphism from $\mathbf{I}_{C}$ to itself. Hence, given the information that the identity functors form an equivalence of categories, in this example one still can choose between two natural isomorphisms for each direction.
- The category of sets and partial functions is equivalent to but not isomorphic with the category of pointed sets and point-preserving maps.
- Consider the category $C$ of finite-dimensional real vector spaces, and the category $D = \mathrm{Mat}(\mathbb{R})$ of all real matrices (the latter category is explained in the article on additive categories). Then $C$ and $D$ are equivalent: The functor $G \colon D \to C$ which maps the object $A_{n}$ of $D$ to the vector space $\mathbb{R}^{n}$ and the matrices in $D$ to the corresponding linear maps is full, faithful and essentially surjective.
- One of the central themes of algebraic geometry is the duality of the category of affine schemes and the category of commutative rings. The functor $G$ associates to every commutative ring its spectrum, the scheme defined by the prime ideals of the ring. Its adjoint $F$ associates to every affine scheme its ring of global sections.
- In functional analysis the category of commutative C*-algebras with identity is contravariantly equivalent to the category of compact Hausdorff spaces. Under this duality, every compact Hausdorff space $X$ is associated with the algebra of continuous complex-valued functions on $X$, and every commutative C*-algebra is associated with the space of its maximal ideals. This is the Gelfand representation.
- In lattice theory, there are a number of dualities, based on representation theorems that connect certain classes of lattices to classes of topological spaces. Probably the most well-known theorem of this kind is Stone's representation theorem for Boolean algebras, which is a special instance within the general scheme of Stone duality. Each Boolean algebra $B$ is mapped to a specific topology on the set of ultrafilters of $B$. Conversely, for any topology the clopen (i.e. closed and open) subsets yield a Boolean algebra. One obtains a duality between the category of Boolean algebras (with their homomorphisms) and Stone spaces (with continuous mappings). Another case of Stone duality is Birkhoff's representation theorem stating a duality between finite partial orders and finite distributive lattices.
- In pointless topology the category of spatial locales is known to be equivalent to the dual of the category of sober spaces.
- For two rings R and S, the product category R-Mod×S-Mod is equivalent to (R×S)-Mod.
- Any category is equivalent to its skeleton.

== Properties ==
As a rule of thumb, an equivalence of categories preserves all "categorical" concepts and properties. If F : C → D is an equivalence, then the following statements are all true:

- the object c of C is an initial object (or terminal object, or zero object), if and only if Fc is an initial object (or terminal object, or zero object) of D
- the morphism α in C is a monomorphism (or epimorphism, or isomorphism), if and only if Fα is a monomorphism (or epimorphism, or isomorphism) in D.
- the functor H : I → C has limit (or colimit) l if and only if the functor FH : I → D has limit (or colimit) Fl. This can be applied to equalizers, products and coproducts among others. Applying it to kernels and cokernels, we see that the equivalence F is an exact functor.
- C is a cartesian closed category (or a topos) if and only if D is cartesian closed (or a topos).

Dualities "turn all concepts around": they turn initial objects into terminal objects, monomorphisms into epimorphisms, kernels into cokernels, limits into colimits etc.

If F : C → D is an equivalence of categories, and G_{1} and G_{2} are two inverses of F, then G_{1} and G_{2} are naturally isomorphic.

If F : C → D is an equivalence of categories, and if C is a preadditive category (or additive category, or abelian category), then D may be turned into a preadditive category (or additive category, or abelian category) in such a way that F becomes an additive functor. On the other hand, any equivalence between additive categories is necessarily additive. (Note that the latter statement is not true for equivalences between preadditive categories.)

An auto-equivalence of a category C is an equivalence F : C → C. The auto-equivalences of C form a group under composition if we consider two auto-equivalences that are naturally isomorphic to be identical. This group captures the essential "symmetries" of C. (One caveat: if C is not a small category, then the auto-equivalences of C may form a proper class rather than a set.)

== See also ==
- Equivalent definitions of mathematical structures
- Homotopy equivalence
