= William Lawvere =

American mathematician and philosopher (1937–2023)

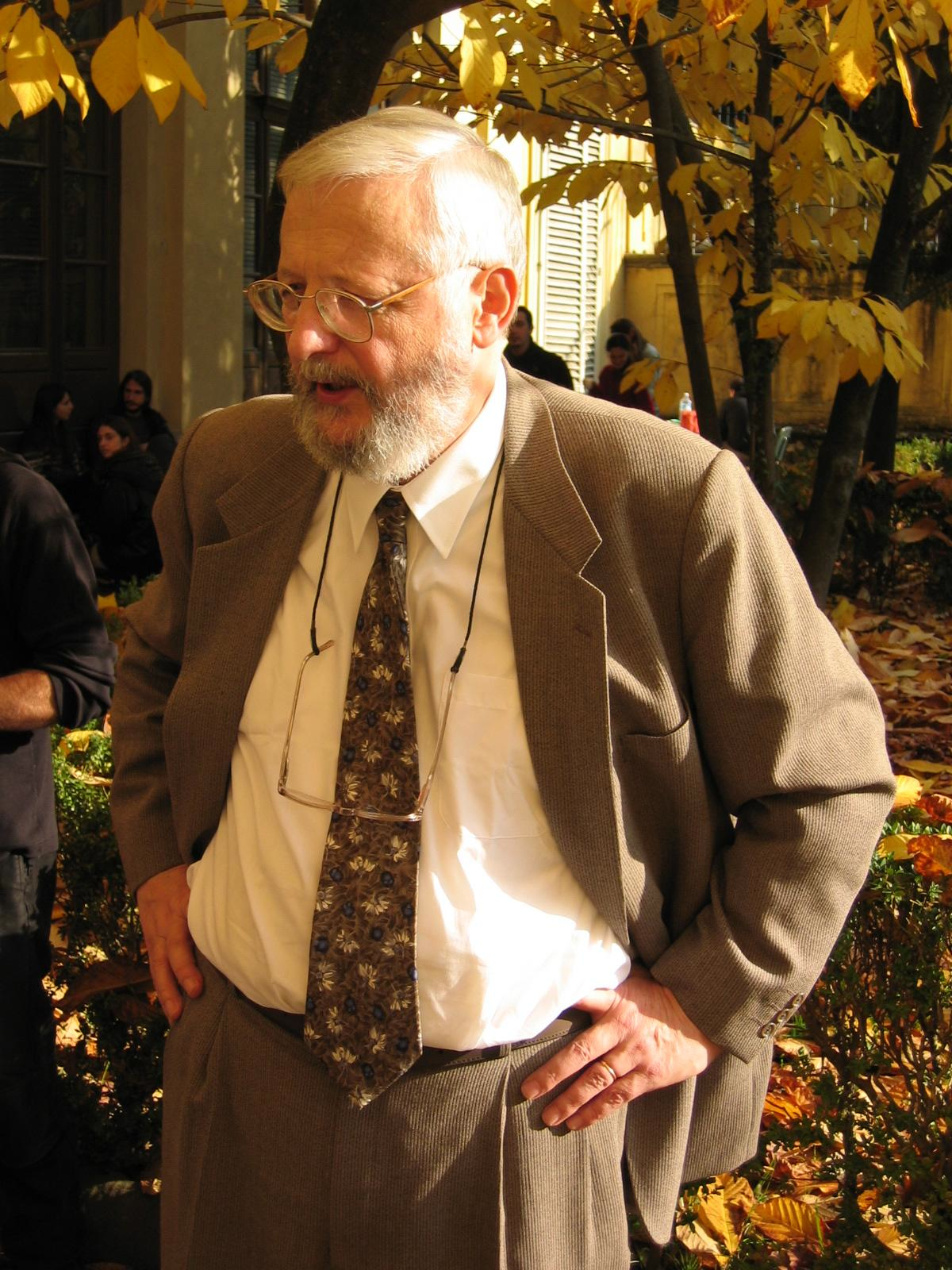
- Lawvere in Florence, 2003
- Born: Francis William Lawvere; February 9, 1937; Muncie, Indiana, U.S.
- Died: January 23, 2023 (aged 85); Chapel Hill, North Carolina, U.S.
- Education: Columbia University
- Known for: Contributions to topos theory and philosophy of mathematics; Lawvere theory; Lawvere's fixed-point theorem
- Awards: "Premio Giulio Preti", awarded by the Regional Council of Tuscany (2010)
- Scientific career
- Fields: Mathematics
- Workplaces: Reed College, ETH Zurich, University of Chicago, CUNY Graduate Center, Dalhousie University, University of Perugia, SUNY-Buffalo
- Doctoral advisor: Samuel Eilenberg

Francis William Lawvere (/lɔːˈvɪər/; February 9, 1937 – January 23, 2023) was an American mathematician and philosopher known for his foundational work in category theory, topos theory, and the philosophy of mathematics. He introduced algebraic theories as categories, developed the Elementary Theory of the Category of Sets (ETCS) as an alternative foundation of mathematics, founded categorical logic and co-founded the field of topos theory. A central theme of his work was the search for a rigorous mathematical foundation for classical continuum mechanics and physics based on categorical methods.

== Biography ==
Born in Muncie, Indiana, and raised on a farm outside Mathews, Lawvere began his university studies at Indiana University in 1955. There, he studied continuum mechanics with Clifford Truesdell and philosophy with Alan Donagan. He learned of category theory while preparing to teach a course on functional analysis for Truesdell, specifically from a problem in John L. Kelley's textbook General Topology. Lawvere found it a promising framework for creating simple, rigorous axioms for the physical ideas of Truesdell and Walter Noll. Truesdell supported Lawvere's application to study with Samuel Eilenberg, a founder of category theory, at Columbia University in 1960.

Before completing his Ph.D., Lawvere spent the 1961–62 academic year at the University of California, Berkeley, as an informal student of model theory and set theory, following lectures by Alfred Tarski and Dana Scott. In his first teaching position at Reed College, he developed the first axioms for the composition of mappings, which later evolved into the Elementary Theory of the Category of Sets (1964).

Lawvere completed his Ph.D. at Columbia in 1963 with Eilenberg. From 1964 to 1967, at the Forschungsinstitut für Mathematik at the ETH in Zürich, he worked on the category of categories and was influenced by Pierre Gabriel's seminars at Oberwolfach on Grothendieck's foundations of algebraic geometry. He then taught at the University of Chicago (1967–68), working with Mac Lane, and at the CUNY Graduate Center (1968–69), working with Alex Heller. He returned to the ETH from 1968 to 1969.

In 1969, Dalhousie University established a research group of 15 researchers with Lawvere at its head, supported by a Killam grant. However, the university terminated the group and dismissed Lawvere in 1971, citing his political activities and for teaching the history of mathematics without permission. The dismissal sparked a significant protest from the student body. Despite the controversy, in 1995 Dalhousie hosted a celebration of 50 years of category theory with both Lawvere and Saunders Mac Lane present.

After leaving Dalhousie, Lawvere ran a seminar in Perugia, Italy (1972–1974), where he worked on enriched categories. In 1974, he became a professor of mathematics at the University at Buffalo, where he remained until his retirement in 2000, often collaborating with Stephen Schanuel. In 1977, he was elected to the Martin professorship in mathematics for five years, which made possible the 1982 meeting on "Categories in Continuum Physics." He was professor emeritus of mathematics and adjunct professor emeritus of philosophy at Buffalo.

Lawvere died on January 23, 2023, in Chapel Hill, North Carolina, after a long illness at the age of 85.

== Mathematical work ==
Lawvere's work is characterized by the use of category theory to provide simple, general foundations for mathematical and physical concepts.

=== Categorical logic and algebraic theories ===
Lawvere's 1963 Ph.D. dissertation, "Functorial Semantics of Algebraic Theories," introduced the category of categories as a framework for universal algebra. This work, now known as a Lawvere theory, treated algebraic theories themselves as categories and their models as functors.

His lectures at the University of Chicago on categorical dynamics were a step toward topos theory, and his CUNY lectures on hyperdoctrines advanced categorical logic. A key discovery from this period was that the existential and universal quantifiers of logic could be characterized as adjoint functors to the substitution functor. This revealed a deep connection between logic and geometry, a theme that pervades his work.

=== Topos theory and enriched categories ===
Back in Zürich for 1968–69, Lawvere proposed elementary (first-order) axioms for a topos, generalizing the concept of the Grothendieck topos (see History of topos theory). He worked with the algebraic topologist Myles Tierney to clarify and apply this theory. Tierney discovered major simplifications in the description of Grothendieck "topologies". Lawvere had pointed out that a Grothendieck topology can be entirely described as an endomorphism on the subobject representor, and Tierney showed that the conditions it needs to satisfy are just idempotence and the preservation of finite intersections. These Lawvere-Tierney topologies are important in both algebraic geometry and model theory because they determine the subtoposes as sheaf-categories. Anders Kock later found further simplifications so that an elementary topos can be described simply as a category with products and equalizers in which the notions of map space and subobject are representable.

While in Perugia, Lawvere worked on various kinds of enriched category. In this framework, the hom-set between two objects is replaced by an object in some other category. A primary example is that a metric space can be viewed as a category enriched over the non-negative real numbers: the objects are the points of the space, and for any two points $x$ and $y$, the "hom-object" is the distance $d(x,y)$. The composition law corresponds to the triangle inequality.

== Work in physics and continuum mechanics ==
A central motivation for Lawvere's work was the search for a rigorous mathematical foundation for physics, specifically classical continuum mechanics. In an interview, he recalled his early studies:

I had been a student at Indiana University from 1955 to January 1960. I liked experimental physics but did not appreciate the imprecise reasoning in some theoretical courses. So I decided to study mathematics first. Truesdell was at the Mathematics Department but he had a great knowledge in Engineering Physics. He took charge of my education there... in 1955 (and subsequently) had advised me on pursuing the study of continuum mechanics and kinetic theory.

This led him to believe that "Categories would clearly be important for simplifying the foundations of continuum physics."

He envisioned a "synthetic physics" where physical laws could be expressed directly in the language of category theory. His 1967 Chicago lectures on categorical dynamics and the subsequent development of synthetic differential geometry were major steps in this direction. This program culminated in the 1982 meeting at Buffalo, "Categories in Continuum Physics," made possible by his Martin professorship. Clifford Truesdell participated in that meeting, as did several other researchers in the rational foundations of continuum physics and in synthetic differential geometry. In his introduction to the proceedings, Lawvere elaborated on his quest for a rigorous, flexible base for physical ideas, free of unnecessary analytic complications.

== Work in philosophy and dialectics ==
Lawvere's work was deeply intertwined with philosophy. He sought to use the precision of category theory to clarify and formalize concepts from metaphysics and epistemology, particularly those from the philosophy of Georg Hegel. He proposed categorical formalizations of Hegelian notions such as objective and subjective logic, Aufhebung, being versus becoming, and intensive versus extensive quantity.

He argued that category theory provides the proper tools to model dialectical concepts such as the unity of opposites. For Lawvere, the concept of adjoint functors was a primary example of a unity of opposites, connecting two seemingly contrary concepts (like logic and geometry, or syntax and semantics) in a precise mathematical relationship.

In his 1992 work "Categories of Space and Quantity," Lawvere wrote:

I am convinced that in the next decades and in the next century dialectical philosophy will have a great role to play in the advance of science. But this will not be possible unless it is studied seriously... It is in the spirit of contributing to that confrontation that I want to discuss some of the progress that has been made by category theorists in providing precise mathematical models for some of the philosophical distinctions which are crucial for dialectics, for example, the distinction between general and particular, between objective and subjective, between being and becoming.

He saw this project as continuing the work of earlier mathematicians like Hermann Grassmann and his Ausdehnungslehre.

== Political views and activities ==
Lawvere was a committed Marxist–Leninist throughout his life. He saw his political commitments as deeply connected to his scientific and philosophical work. In 1971, his dismissal from Dalhousie University was a result of his vocal opposition to the Vietnam War and the Canadian government's use of the War Measures Act.

Lawvere often infused his mathematical writing with philosophical and political concepts. In his 1970 paper "Quantifiers and Sheaves," he connects the mathematical concept of adjoint functors to the dialectical principle of the unity of opposites and cites Mao Zedong's essay "On Contradiction", as well as Vladimir Lenin's theory of knowledge. In a passage from that paper, he wrote:

When the main contradictions of a thing have been found, the scientific procedure is to summarize them in slogans which one then constantly uses as an ideological weapon for the further development and transformation of the thing. Doing this for "set theory" requires taking account of the experience that the main pairs of opposing tendencies in mathematics take the form of adjoint functors, and frees us of the mathematically irrelevant traces (∈) left behind by the process of accumulating (∪) the power set (P) at each stage of a metaphysical "construction".

== Awards and honors ==
- In 2010, he received the "Premio Giulio Preti," awarded by the Regional Council of Tuscany.
- In 2012, he became a fellow of the American Mathematical Society.

== Selected books ==
- 1986 Categories in Continuum Physics (Buffalo, N.Y. 1982), edited by Lawvere and Stephen H. Schanuel (with Introduction by Lawvere pp 1–16), Springer Lecture Notes in Mathematics 1174. ISBN 3-540-16096-5; ebook.
- 2003 (2002) Sets for Mathematics (with Robert Rosebrugh). Cambridge University Press. ISBN 0-521-01060-8.
- 2009 Conceptual Mathematics: A First Introduction to Categories (with Stephen H. Schanuel). Cambridge University Press, 2nd ed. ISBN 978-0521719162; 1997 pbk edition.

== See also ==
- Category theory
- Elementary theory of abstract categories
- Topos theory
- History of topos theory
- Synthetic differential geometry
- Philosophy of mathematics
- Dialectic
- Marxism–Leninism
- Lawvere–Tierney topology
