= Functor =

Mapping between categories

In mathematics, specifically category theory, a functor is a mapping between categories. Functors were first considered in algebraic topology, where algebraic objects (such as the fundamental group) are associated to topological spaces, and maps between these algebraic objects are associated to continuous maps between spaces. Nowadays, functors are used throughout modern mathematics to relate various categories. Thus, functors are important in every area of mathematics where category theory is applied.

The words category and functor were borrowed by mathematicians from the philosophers Aristotle and Rudolf Carnap, respectively. Carnap used functor in a linguistic context; see function word.

== Definition ==
A category with objects X, Y, Z and morphisms f, g, g ∘ f

Functor $F$ must preserve the composition of morphisms $g$ and $f$

Let $C$ and $D$ be categories. A functor $F$ from $C$ to $D$ is a mapping that:

- associates each object $X$ in $C$ to an object $F(X)$ in $D$,
- associates each morphism $f: X \to Y$ in $C$ to a morphism $F(f): F(X) \to F(Y)$ in $D$ such that the following two conditions hold:
  - $F(\mathrm{id}_{X}) = \mathrm{id}_{F(X)}\,\!$ for every object $X$ in $C$,
  - $F(g \circ f) = F(g) \circ F(f)$ for all morphisms $f: X \to Y\,\!$ and $g:Y\to Z$ in $C$.

That is, functors must preserve identity morphisms and composition of morphisms.

=== Covariance and contravariance ===
There are many constructions in mathematics that would be functors, except that they "turn morphisms around" and "reverse composition". We then define a contravariant functor $F$ from $C$ to $D$ as a mapping that

- associates each object $X$ in $C$ with an object $F(X)$ in $D$,
- associates each morphism $f: X\to Y$ in $C$ with a morphism $F(f):F(Y) \to F(X)$ in $D$ such that the following two conditions hold:
  - $F(\mathrm{id}_X) = \mathrm{id}_{F(X)}\,\!$ for every object $X$ in $C$,
  - $F(g \circ f) = F(f) \circ F(g)$ for all morphisms $f: X\to Y$ and $g: Y\to Z$ in $C$.

Variance of functors (composite):

- The composite of two functors of the same variance:
  - $\mathrm{Covariant} \circ \mathrm{Covariant} \to \mathrm{Covariant}$
  - $\mathrm{Contravariant} \circ \mathrm{Contravariant} \to \mathrm{Covariant}$
- The composite of two functors of opposite variance:
  - $\mathrm{Covariant} \circ \mathrm{Contravariant} \to \mathrm{Contravariant}$
  - $\mathrm{Contravariant} \circ \mathrm{Covariant} \to \mathrm{Contravariant}$

We see that $(\{\text{Covariant},\text{Contravariant}\},\circ)\cong\mathbb Z/2\mathbb Z$.

Note that contravariant functors reverse the direction of composition.

Ordinary functors are also called covariant functors in order to distinguish them from contravariant ones. Note that one can also define a contravariant functor as a covariant functor on the opposite category $C^\mathrm{op}$. Some authors prefer to write all expressions covariantly. That is, instead of saying $F: C\to D$ is a contravariant functor, they simply write $F: C^{\mathrm{op}} \to D$ (or sometimes $F: C \to D^{\mathrm{op}}$) and call it a functor.

Contravariant functors are also occasionally called cofunctors.

There is a convention which refers to "vectors"—i.e., vector fields, elements of the space of sections $\Gamma(TM)$ of a tangent bundle $TM$—as "contravariant" and to "covectors"—i.e., 1-forms, elements of the space of sections $\Gamma\mathord\left(T^*M\right)$ of a cotangent bundle $T^*M$—as "covariant". This terminology originates in physics, and its rationale has to do with the position of the indices ("upstairs" and "downstairs") in expressions such as ${x'}^{\,i} = \Lambda^i_j x^j$ for $\mathbf{x}' = \boldsymbol{\Lambda}\mathbf{x}$, or $\omega'_i = \Lambda^j_i \omega_j$ for $\boldsymbol{\omega}' = \boldsymbol{\omega}\boldsymbol{\Lambda}^\textsf{T}.$ In this formalism it is observed that the coordinate transformation symbol $\Lambda^j_i$ (representing the matrix $\boldsymbol{\Lambda}^\textsf{T}$) acts on the "covector coordinates" "in the same way" as on the basis vectors: $\mathbf{e}_i = \Lambda^j_i\mathbf{e}_j$—whereas it acts "in the opposite way" on the "vector coordinates" (but "in the same way" as on the basis covectors: $\mathbf{e}^i = \Lambda^i_j \mathbf{e}^j$). This terminology is contrary to the one used in category theory because it is the covectors that have pullbacks in general and are thus contravariant, whereas vectors in general are covariant since they can be pushed forward. See also covariance and contravariance of vectors.

=== Opposite functor ===
Every functor $F:C\to D$ induces the opposite functor $F^\mathrm{op} : C^\mathrm{op}\to D^\mathrm{op}$, where $C^\mathrm{op}$ and $D^\mathrm{op}$ are the opposite categories to $C$ and $D$.

By definition, $F^\mathrm{op}$ maps objects and morphisms in the identical way as does $F$. Since $C^\mathrm{op}$ does not coincide with $C$ as a category, and similarly for $D$, $F^\mathrm{op}$ is distinguished from $F$. For example, when composing $F: C_0\to C_1$ with $G: C_1^\mathrm{op}\to C_2$, one should use either $G\circ F^\mathrm{op}$ or $G^\mathrm{op}\circ F$. Note that $\left(F^\mathrm{op}\right)^\mathrm{op} = F$.

=== Bifunctors and multifunctors ===
A bifunctor (also known as a binary functor) is a functor whose domain is a product category. For example, the Hom functor is of the type $C^\mathrm{op}\times C\to \mathbf{Set}$. It can be seen as a functor in two arguments; it is contravariant in one argument, covariant in the other.

A multifunctor is a generalization of the functor concept to $n$ variables. So, for example, a bifunctor is a multifunctor with $n=2$.

== Properties ==
Two important consequences of the functor axioms are:

- $F$ transforms each commutative diagram in $C$ into a commutative diagram in $D$;
- if $f$ is an isomorphism in $C$, then $F(f)$ is an isomorphism in $D$.

One can compose functors, i.e. if $F$ is a functor from $A$ to $B$ and $G$ is a functor from $B$ to $C$ then one can form the composite functor $G\circ F$ from $A$ to $C$. Composition of functors is associative where defined. Identity of composition of functors is the identity functor. This shows that functors can be considered as morphisms in categories of categories, for example in the category of small categories.

A small category with a single object is the same thing as a monoid: the morphisms of a one-object category can be thought of as elements of the monoid, and composition in the category is thought of as the monoid operation. Functors between one-object categories correspond to monoid homomorphisms. So in a sense, functors between arbitrary categories are a kind of generalization of monoid homomorphisms to categories with more than one object.

== Examples ==
Diagram
For categories $C$ and $J$, a diagram of type $J$ in $C$ is a covariant functor $D: J\to C$.
(Category theoretical) presheaf
For categories $C$ and $J$, a $J$-presheaf on $C$ is a contravariant functor $D: C\to J$. In the special case when $J$ is $\mathbf{Set}$, the category of sets and functions, $D$ is called a presheaf on $C$.
Presheaves (over a topological space)
If X is a topological space, then the open sets in X form a partially ordered set Open(X) under inclusion. Like every partially ordered set, Open(X) forms a small category by adding a single arrow U → V if and only if $U \subseteq V$. Contravariant functors on Open(X) are called presheaves on X. For instance, by assigning to every open set U the associative algebra of real-valued continuous functions on U, one obtains a presheaf of algebras on X.
Constant functor
A functor $C\to D$ which maps every object of $C$ to a fixed object $X$ in $D$ and every morphism in $C$ to the identity morphism on $X$. Such a functor is called a constant or selection functor.
Endofunctor
A functor that maps a category to that same category; e.g., polynomial functor.
Identity functor
The identity functor in a category $C$, denoted $1_C$ or $\mathrm{id}_C$, maps an object to itself and a morphism to itself. The identity functor is an endofunctor.
Diagonal functor
The diagonal functor is defined as the functor from $D$ to the functor category $D^C$ which sends each object in $D$ to the constant functor at that object.
Limit functor
For a fixed index category J, if every functor J → C has a limit (for instance if C is complete), then the limit functor C^{J} → C assigns to each functor its limit. The existence of this functor can be proved by realizing that it is the right-adjoint to the diagonal functor and invoking the Freyd adjoint functor theorem. This requires a suitable version of the axiom of choice. Similar remarks apply to the colimit functor (which assigns to every functor its colimit, and is covariant).
Power sets functor
The power set functor P : Set → Set maps each set to its power set and each function $f \colon X \to Y$ to the map which sends $U \in \mathcal{P}(X)$ to its image $f(U) \in \mathcal{P}(Y)$. One can also consider the contravariant power set functor which sends $f \colon X \to Y$ to the map which sends $V \subseteq Y$ to its inverse image $f^{-1}(V) \subseteq X.$
For example, if $X = \{0,1\}$, then $F(X) = \mathcal{P}(X) = \{\{\}, \{0\}, \{1\}, X\}$. Suppose $f(0) = \{\}$ and $f(1) = X$. Then $F(f)$ is the function which sends any subset $U$ of $X$ to its image $f(U)$, in this case $\{\} \mapsto f(\{\}) = \{\}$. For the other values,
$$\begin{align}
\{0\} \mapsto f(\{0\}) &= \{f(0)\} = \{\{\}\}, \\
\{1\} \mapsto f(\{1\}) &= \{f(1)\} = \{X\}, \\
\{0,1\} \mapsto f(\{0,1\}) &= \{f(0), f(1)\} = \{\{\}, X\}.
\end{align}$$

Note that $f(\{0, 1\})$ consequently generates the trivial topology on $X$. Also note that although the function $f$ in this example mapped to the power set of $X$, that need not be the case in general.

Dual vector space
The map which assigns to every vector space its dual space and to every linear map its dual or transpose is a contravariant functor from the category of all vector spaces over a fixed field to itself.
Fundamental group
Consider the category of pointed topological spaces, i.e. topological spaces with distinguished points. The objects are pairs (X, x_{0}), where X is a topological space and x_{0} is a point in X. A morphism from (X, x_{0}) to (Y, y_{0}) is given by a continuous map f : X → Y with f(x_{0}) = y_{0}.
To every topological space X with distinguished point x_{0}, one can define the fundamental group based at x_{0}, denoted π_{1}(X, x_{0}). This is the group of homotopy classes of loops based at x_{0}, with the group operation of concatenation. If f : X → Y is a morphism of pointed spaces, then every loop in X with base point x_{0} can be composed with f to yield a loop in Y with base point y_{0}. This operation is compatible with the homotopy equivalence relation and the composition of loops, and we get a group homomorphism from π(X, x_{0}) to π(Y, y_{0}). We thus obtain a functor from the category of pointed topological spaces to the category of groups.
In the category of topological spaces (without distinguished point), one considers homotopy classes of generic curves, but they cannot be composed unless they share an endpoint. Thus one has the fundamental groupoid instead of the fundamental group, and this construction is functorial.
Algebra of continuous functions
A contravariant functor from the category of topological spaces (with continuous maps as morphisms) to the category of real associative algebras is given by assigning to every topological space X the algebra C(X) of all real-valued continuous functions on that space. Every continuous map f : X → Y induces an algebra homomorphism C(f) : C(Y) → C(X) by the rule C(f)(φ) = φ ∘ f for every φ in C(Y).
Tangent and cotangent bundles
The map which sends every differentiable manifold to its tangent bundle and every smooth map to its derivative is a covariant functor from the category of differentiable manifolds to the category of vector bundles.
Doing this constructions pointwise gives the tangent space, a covariant functor from the category of pointed differentiable manifolds to the category of real vector spaces. Likewise, cotangent space is a contravariant functor, essentially the composition of the tangent space with the dual space above.
Group actions/representations
Every group G can be considered as a category with a single object whose morphisms are the elements of G. A functor from G to Set is then nothing but a group action of G on a particular set, i.e. a G-set. Likewise, a functor from G to the category of vector spaces, Vect_{K}, is a linear representation of G. In general, a functor G → C can be considered as an "action" of G on an object in the category C. If C is a group, then this action is a group homomorphism.
Lie algebras
Assigning to every real (complex) Lie group its real (complex) Lie algebra defines a functor.
Tensor products
If C denotes the category of vector spaces over a fixed field, with linear maps as morphisms, then the tensor product $V \otimes W$ defines a functor C × C → C which is covariant in both arguments.
Forgetful functors
The functor U : Grp → Set which maps a group to its underlying set and a group homomorphism to its underlying function of sets is a functor. Functors like these, which "forget" some structure, are termed forgetful functors. Another example is the functor Rng → Ab which maps a ring to its underlying additive abelian group. Morphisms in Rng (ring homomorphisms) become morphisms in Ab (abelian group homomorphisms).
Free functors
Going in the opposite direction of forgetful functors are free functors. The free functor F : Set → Grp sends every set X to the free group generated by X. Functions get mapped to group homomorphisms between free groups. Free constructions exist for many categories based on structured sets. See free object.
Homomorphism groups
To every pair A, B of abelian groups one can assign the abelian group Hom(A, B) consisting of all group homomorphisms from A to B. This is a functor which is contravariant in the first and covariant in the second argument, i.e. it is a functor Ab^{op} × Ab → Ab (where Ab denotes the category of abelian groups with group homomorphisms). If f : A_{1} → A_{2} and g : B_{1} → B_{2} are morphisms in Ab, then the group homomorphism Hom(f, g): Hom(A_{2}, B_{1}) → Hom(A_{1}, B_{2}) is given by φ ↦ g ∘ φ ∘ f. See Hom functor.
Representable functors
We can generalize the previous example to any category C. To every pair X, Y of objects in C one can assign the set Hom(X, Y) of morphisms from X to Y. This defines a functor to Set which is contravariant in the first argument and covariant in the second, i.e. it is a functor C^{op} × C → Set. If f : X_{1} → X_{2} and g : Y_{1} → Y_{2} are morphisms in C, then the map Hom(f, g) : Hom(X_{2}, Y_{1}) → Hom(X_{1}, Y_{2}) is given by φ ↦ g ∘ φ ∘ f.
Functors like these are called representable functors. An important goal in many settings is to determine whether a given functor is representable.

== Relation to other categorical concepts ==
Let C and D be categories. The collection of all functors from C to D forms the objects of a category: the functor category. Morphisms in this category are natural transformations between functors.

Functors are often defined by universal properties; examples are the tensor product, the direct sum and direct product of groups or vector spaces, construction of free groups and modules, direct and inverse limits. The concepts of limit and colimit generalize several of the above.

Universal constructions often give rise to pairs of adjoint functors.

== Computer implementations ==
Functors sometimes appear in functional programming. For instance, the programming language Haskell has a class Functor where fmap is a polytypic function used to map functions (morphisms on Hask, the category of Haskell types) between existing types to functions between some new types.

== See also ==
- Anafunctor
- Profunctor
- Functor category
- Kan extension
- Pseudofunctor
