= Pyknotic set =

Mathematical concept

In mathematics, especially in topology, a pyknotic set is a sheaf of sets on the site of compact Hausdorff spaces (with some fixed Grothendieck universes). The notion was introduced by Barwick and Haine to provide a convenient setting for homological algebra. The term pyknotic comes from the Greek πυκνός, meaning dense, compact or thick. The notion can be compared to other approaches of introducing generalized spaces for the purpose of homological algebra such as Clausen and Scholze's condensed sets or Johnstone's topological topos.

Pyknotic sets form a coherent topos, while condensed sets do not. Comparing pyknotic sets with his approach with Clausen, Scholze writes:

In a recent preprint [BH19], Barwick and Haine set up closely related foundations, but using different set-theoretic conventions. In particular, they assume the existence of universes, fixing in particular a “tiny” and a “small” universe, and look at sheaves on tiny profinite sets with values in small sets; they term these pyknotic sets. In our language, placing ourselves in the small universe, this would be κ-condensed sets for the first strongly inaccessible cardinal κ they consider (the one giving rise to the tiny universe).
