= Effective topos =

In mathematics, the effective topos ${\mathsf{Eff}}$ introduced by Martin Hyland (1982) captures the mathematical idea of effectivity within the category theoretical framework.

== Preliminaries ==
=== Kleene realizability ===
The topos is based on the partial combinatory algebra given by Kleene's first algebra ${\mathcal{K}}_1$. In Kleene's notion of recursive realizability, any predicate is assigned realizing numbers, i.e. a subset of ${\mathbb N}$. The extremal propositions are $\top$ and $\bot$, realized by ${\mathbb N}$ and $\{\}$. However in general, this process assigns more data to a proposition than just a binary truth value.

A formula with $k$ free variables will give rise to a map in $(\mathcal P{\mathbb N})^{{\mathbb N}^k}$ the values of which are the subsets of corresponding realizing numbers.

=== Realizability topoi ===
${\mathsf{Eff}}$ is a prime example of a realizability topos. These are a class of elementary topoi with an intuitionistic internal logic and fulfilling a form of dependent choice. They are generally not Grothendieck topoi.

In particular, the effective topos is ${\mathsf{RT}}({\mathcal{K}}_1)$. Other realizability topos constructions can be said to abstract away some aspects played by ${\mathbb N}$ here.

== Definition ==
There are several ways to construct the effective topos, for example, via the notion of tripos, or as the ex/reg completion of the category of assemblies. The following is a fully unfolded explicit definition.

An object of the effective topos is a set $X$ equipped with a function $E : X^2 \to \mathcal{P}(\N)$ satisfying certain conditions. We denote $n \in E(x, y)$ by $n \Vdash x = y$. (The notation is not standardized; the usage of the $=$ symbol overloads its normal meaning, similarly to the notation $P(X = Y)$ in probability theory.) Informally, this means that $n$ is a computational witness, or realizer of the equality $x = y$. The conditions to be satisfied are the following:

- There must exist a program $e$ such that for all $n \in \N$ and $x, y \in X$, if $n \Vdash x = y$ then the output of $e$ on $n$, i.e., $\phi_e(n)$ (where $\phi_e$ is the $e$-th partial computable function), is defined, and $\phi_e(n) \Vdash y = x$. In short, $e$ takes a realizer of $x = y$ and outputs a realizer of $y = x$ (for all $x, y$). (Note that $e$ cannot depend on $x, y$, and it only receives the realizer of $x = y$ as input, without further information on $x$ and $y$.)
- Similarly, there must exist a program which takes a realizer of $x = y$ and a realizer of $y = z$, and outputs a realizer of $x = z$ (for all $x, y, z$).

A realizer of $x = x$ will be called more simply a realizer of $x$.

A functional relation from an object $X$ to an object $Y$ is a function $f : X \times Y \to \mathcal{P}(\N)$, again satisfying certain conditions. We suggestively denote $n \in f(x, y)$ by $n \Vdash f(x) = y$ (again, this is a special notation; $f(x)$ has no meaning by itself). This informally means that $n$ realizes the fact that $f$ sends $x$ to $y$, or “realizes $f(x) = y$”. The conditions are the following:

- There exists a program which takes a realizer of $f(x) = y$ and outputs a realizer of $x$ and a realizer of $y$ (for all $x \in X, y \in Y$).
- There exists a program which takes a realizer of $f(x) = y$ and realizers of $x = x'$ and $y = y'$, and outputs a realizer of $f(x') = y'$ (for all $x, x', y, y'$).
- There exists a program which takes realizers of $f(x) = y$ and $f(x) = y'$, and outputs a realizer of $y = y'$ (for all $x, y, y'$).
- There exists a program $e$ such that for all $x \in X$ and for all realizer $n$ of $x$, there exists some $y \in Y$ such that the output $\phi_e(n)$ realizes $f(x) = y$.

Suppose $f$ is a functional relation from $X$ to $Y$ and $g$ is a functional relation from $Y$ to $Z$. The composition $g \circ f$ is the functional relation from $X$ to $Z$ defined by letting the realizers of $(g \circ f)(x) = z$ be the codes of pairs $(r, s)$ such that, for some $y \in Y$, we have $r \Vdash f(x) = y$ and $s \Vdash g(y) = z$. The identity functional relation $\operatorname{id}$ on an object $X$ is defined by letting the realizers of $\operatorname{id}(x) = y$ be just the realizers of $x = y$.

The morphisms from $X$ to $Y$ in the effective topos are the functional relations from $X$ to $Y$, quotiented to identify $f$ and $g$ when there exists a program which maps realizers of $f(x) = y$ to realizers of $g(x) = y$ (for all $x, y$), and another program which maps realizers of $g(x) = y$ to realizers of $f(x) = y$. Composition of morphisms is induced on the quotients by composition on the level of functional relations, and likewise for identity morphisms.

== Relationship to assemblies ==
The effective topos arises as a completion of the simpler category of assemblies.

An assembly is a set $X$ equipped with a function $R : X \to \mathcal{P}(\N)$. We denote $n \in R(x)$ by $n \Vdash x$, read “$n$ realizes $x$”. Every assembly $X$ can be construed as an object of the effective topos, by declaring that $n$ realizes $x = y$ when $x$ and $y$ are actually equal and $n$ realizes them in the assembly $X$. (Thus, the realizers of $x$ in $X$ as an object of the effective topos, i.e., the realizers of $x = x$, are exactly the realizers of $x$ in $X$ as an assembly.)

A morphism of assemblies $f : X \to Y$ is a function $f : X \to Y$ between the underlying sets such that there exists a program, independent of $x \in X$, which maps realizers of $x$ to realizers of $f(x)$. Such a morphism gives rise to a morphism in the effective topos, represented by the functional relation (still denoted $f$) where $f(x) = y$ is realized if and only if $f(x)$ is actually equal to $y$, and then the realizers of $f(x) = y$ are the pairs of a realizer of $x$ and a realizer of $y$.

This correspondence makes the category of assemblies a full subcategory of the effective topos.

The category of sets is a full subcategory of the category of assemblies, via the functor $\nabla$ that maps a set $X$ to the assembly with underlying set $X$ where every element is realized by every natural number. In particular, the category of sets is also a full subcategory of the effective topos.

== Categorical operations in the effective topos ==
The effective topos is an elementary topos with natural numbers object. This means that it supports a number of standard categorical constructions, which are explicitly performed as follows.

- The initial object is the empty assembly.
- The terminal object is the unit assembly, a singleton where the unique element is realized by every natural number.
- The natural numbers object is $\N$ where each natural number is realized only by itself.
- The product of two objects $X$ and $Y$ is the Cartesian product of sets $X \times Y$ where a realizer of $(x, y)$ in $X \times Y$ is the code of a pair of a realizer of $x$ and a realizer of $y$.
- The coproduct of $X$ and $Y$ is the coproduct of sets $X + Y$ where a realizer of $x \in X$ in $X + Y$ is the code of a pair of 0 and a realizer of $x$ in $X$, and a realizer of $y \in Y$ in $X + Y$ is the code of a pair of 1 and a realizer of $y$ in $Y$.
- The subobject classifier $\Omega$ is $\mathcal{P}(\N)$ where a realizer of $P = Q$ is a pair of a program which returns an element of $Q$ given an element of $P$, and a program which returns an element of $P$ given an element of $Q$. It is not (isomorphic to) an assembly.

== Properties ==
=== Relation to Sets ===
Some objects exhibit a rather trivial existence predicate depending only on the validity of the equality relation "$=$" of sets, so that valid equality maps to the top set $\mathbb N$ and rejected equality maps to $\{\}$. This gives rise to a full and faithful functor $\nabla\colon{\mathsf{Sets}}\to{\mathsf{Eff}}$ out of the category of sets, which has the finite-limit preserving global sections functor $\Gamma$ as its left-adjoint. This factors through a finite-limit preserving, full and faithful embedding $\omega$-${\mathsf{Sets}}\to{\mathsf{Eff}}$.

=== NNO ===
The topos has a natural numbers object $N=\langle{\mathbb N}, E_{\mathbb N}\rangle$ with simply $E_{\mathbb N}(n)=\{n\}$. Sentences true about $N$ are exactly the recursively realized sentences of Heyting arithmetic ${\mathsf{HA}}$.

Now arrows $N\to N$ may be understood as the total recursive functions and this also holds internally for $N^N$. The latter is the pair given by total recursive functions $\mathrm{TR}$ and a relation such that $E_\mathrm{TR}(f)$ is the set of codes $e\in {\mathbb N}$ for $f$. The latter is a subset of the naturals but not just a singleton, since there are several indices computing the same recursive function. So here the second entry of the objects represent the realizing data.

With $N$ and functions from and to it, as well as with simple rules for the equality relations when forming finite products $\times$, one may now more broadly define the hereditarily effective operations. Again one may think of functions in $N^N$ as given by indices and their equality is determined by the objects that compute the same function. This equality clearly puts a constraint on $N^{(N^N)}$, as these functions come out to be only those computable functions that also properly respect the mentioned equality in their domain. Et cetera. The situation for general $\langle X, E_X\rangle\to \langle Y, E_Y\rangle$, equality (in the sense of the $E$'s) in domain and image must be respected.

==== Properties and principles ====
With this, one may validate Markov's principle ${\mathrm{MP}}$ and the extended Church's principle ${\mathrm{ECT}}_0$ (and a second-order variant thereof), which come down to simple statement about object such as $N^N$ or $(1+1)^N$. These imply ${\mathrm{CT}}_0$ and independence of premise ${\mathrm{IP}}_0$.

A choice principle $N^N$ related to Brouwerian weak continuity fails. From any object, there are only countably many arrows to $N$. $\Omega^N$ fulfills a uniformity principle. $N$ is not the countable coproduct of copies of $1$. This topos is not a category of sheaves.

=== Analysis ===
The object $\langle{\mathbb Q}^{\mathbb N}, E_{{\mathbb Q}^{\mathbb N}}\rangle$ is effective in a formal sense and from it one may define computable Cauchy sequences. Through a quotient, the topos has a real numbers object which has no non-trivial decidable subobject. With choice, the notion of Dedekind reals coincides with the Cauchy one.

==== Properties and principles ====
Analysis here corresponds to the recursive school of constructivism. It rejects the claim that $x\le 0\lor 0\le x$ would hold for all reals $x$. Formulations of the intermediate value theorem fail and all functions from the reals to the reals are provenly continuous. A Specker sequence exists and then Bolzano–Weierstrass fails.

== See also ==
- Categorical logic
