= Elementary topos =

Type of category in mathematics

In mathematics, an elementary topos (plural toposes or topoi) is a category which has properties making it resemble the category of sets. Elementary toposes can be used as models of intuitionistic higher-order logic.

== Introduction ==
An elementary topos (hereafter just topos) can be pictured as an alternate mathematical universe. It is a category which is sufficiently like the category of sets (the “standard mathematical universe”) that common mathematical constructions can be carried in it, such as subsets, function spaces, etc.

More precisely, a topos supports intuitionistic higher-order logic as an internal language. As such, toposes are widely used as models of constructive mathematics.

== Definition ==
As originally defined by Lawvere and Tierney, an elementary topos is a category $\mathcal{E}$ such that:

- $\mathcal{E}$ is finitely complete (it has all finite limits). Equivalently, it has a terminal object, binary products, and binary equalizers.
- $\mathcal{E}$ is finitely cocomplete (it has all finite colimits). Equivalently, it has an initial object, binary coproducts and binary coequalizers.
- $\mathcal{E}$ has exponential objects (in addition to binary products, which are required for defining exponential objects). Together with having a terminal object and binary products, this means that $\mathcal{E}$ is Cartesian closed.
- $\mathcal{E}$ has a subobject classifier.

The requirement that $\mathcal{E}$ be finitely cocomplete was later observed to be redundant, as it follows from the rest. (However, the general construction of finite colimits is relatively complicated; in most examples, one can find a more concrete description, which simplifies the translation of statements from the internal language.)

An even more minimalistic definition is possible: an elementary topos is a finitely complete category with power objects. (This essentially replaces the requirements to have exponentials $A^B$ and a subobject classifier $\Omega$ with just the special case of exponentials $\Omega^B$.)

Many other properties follow, such as being regular and moreover exact.

== Logical functors ==
A logical functor is a functor between topoi that preserves finite limits and power objects. Logical functors preserve the structures that topoi have. In particular, they preserve finite colimits, subobject classifiers, and exponential objects.

== Examples ==
Having a subobject classifier is a strong requirement, which rules out most categories of algebraic structures such as groups, rings, etc.

Every Grothendieck topos (a category equivalent to the category of sheaves on a site) is an elementary topos. Important special cases include:

- For any small category $\mathcal{C}$, the presheaf category $\operatorname{Set}^{\mathcal{C}^\operatorname{op}}$.
- As a further special case of the previous example, for any group $G$, the category of $G$-sets, i.e., sets equipped with an action of $G$, with equivariant maps as morphisms.
- For any topological space $X$, the category of sheaves on $X$.
- The classifying topos for a geometric theory.

The category of finite sets is an elementary topos (however, it lacks a natural numbers object), and similarly for finite $G$-sets.

The effective topos is an important example of an elementary topos with natural numbers object. It is not a Grothendieck topos. It can be viewed as a universe of computable mathematics. This example is generalized by realizability toposes.

A source of examples is the fundamental theorem of topos theory, which states that for every elementary topos $\mathcal{E}$ and every object $\Gamma \in \mathcal{E}$, the slice category $\mathcal{E}/\Gamma$ is an elementary topos.

== See also ==
- History of topos theory
- Intuitionistic type theory

== Bibliography ==
- McLarty, Colin (1992). Elementary Categories, Elementary Toposes. Clarendon Press. ISBN 978-0-19-158949-2.
- MacLane, Saunders; Moerdijk, Ieke (2012) [1994]. Sheaves in Geometry and Logic: A First Introduction to Topos Theory. Springer. ISBN 978-1-4612-0927-0.
- Johnstone, Peter T. (2014) [1977]. Topos Theory. Courier. ISBN 978-0-486-49336-7.
- Johnstone, Peter T. (2002a). Sketches of an Elephant: A Topos Theory Compendium. Vol. 1. Clarendon Press. ISBN 978-0-19-853425-9.
- Johnstone, Peter T. (2002b). Sketches of an Elephant: A Topos Theory Compendium. Vol. 2. Clarendon Press. ISBN 978-0-19-851598-2.
- Lambek, Joachim; Scott, Philip J. (1986). Introduction to higher order categorical logic. Cambridge University Press. ISBN 978-0-521-35653-4. MR 0856915.
- Goldblatt, Robert (1984). Topoi: the categorical analysis of logic. Studies in logic and the foundation of mathematics. Vol. 98. Elsevier. ISBN 0-444-86711-2.
- van Oosten, Jaap (2024). "Topos theory" (PDF). Archived (PDF) from the original on 25 March 2024.
