= Generalized space =

In mathematics, a generalized space is a generalization of a topological space. Impetuses for such a generalization comes at least in two forms:

1. A desire to apply concepts like cohomology for objects that are not traditionally viewed as spaces. For example, a topos was originally introduced for this reason.
2. A practical need to remedy the deficiencies that some naturally occurring categories of spaces (e.g., ones in functional analysis) tend not to be abelian, a standard requirement to do homological algebra.

Alexander Grothendieck's dictum says a topos is a generalized space; precisely, he and his followers write in exposé 4 of SGA I:

On peut donc dire que la notion de topos, dérivé naturel du point de vue faisceautique en Topologie, constitue à son tour un élargissement substantiel de la notion d'espace topologique, un grand nombre de situations qui autrefois n'étaient pas considérées comme relevant de intuition topologique

However, William Lawvere argues in his 1975 paper that this dictum should be turned backward; namely, "a topos is the 'algebra of continuous (set-valued) functions' on a generalized space, not the generalized space itself."

A generalized space should not be confused with a geometric object that can substitute the role of spaces. For example, a stack is typically not viewed as a space but as a geometric object with a richer structure.

== Examples ==
- A locale is a sort of a space but perhaps not with enough points. The topos theory is sometimes said to be the theory of generalized locales.
- Jean Giraud's gros topos, Peter Johnstone's topological topos, or more recent incarnations such as condensed sets or pyknotic sets. These attempt to embed the category of (certain) topological spaces into a larger category of generalized spaces, in a way philosophically if not technically similar to the way one generalizes a function to a generalized function. (Note these constructions are more precise than various completions of the category of topological spaces.)

== Bibliography ==
- Lawvere, F. William (1975). "Continuously Variable Sets; Algebraic Geometry = Geometric Logic". Logic Colloquium '73, Proceedings of the Logic Colloquium. Studies in Logic and the Foundations of Mathematics. Vol. 80. pp. 135–156. doi:10.1016/S0049-237X(08)71947-5. ISBN 978-0-444-10642-1.
- Lawvere, F. William (2005), "Categories of spaces may not be generalized spaces as exemplified by directed graphs" (PDF), Reprints in Theory and Applications of Categories (9): 1–7
- Johnstone, Peter T. (1985). "How general is a generalized space?". Aspects of Topology. pp. 77–112. doi:10.1017/CBO9781107359925.004. ISBN 978-0-521-27815-7.
- Grothendieck, A.; Verdier, J. L. (1972), "Topos", Théorie des Topos et Cohomologie Etale des Schémas, Lecture Notes in Mathematics, vol. 269, Springer, pp. 299–518, doi:10.1007/BFb0081555, ISBN 978-3-540-05896-0
