= Subobject classifier =

Mathematical object in category theory

In the mathematical field of category theory, a subobject classifier is a special object $\Omega$ of a category such that, informally, the subobjects of any object $X$ correspond to the morphisms from $X$ to $\Omega$. This provides an analogue of the set of Booleans $\{0, 1\}$ in categories other than the category of sets.

The main use of subobject classifiers is in topos theory, where an elementary topos is defined as a category with a subobject classifier and certain additional requirements. In the internal language of an elementary topos, the subobject classifier is used to interpret truth values, hence the alternative name “object of truth values”.

== Introduction ==
Let $X$ be a set. A subset $Y \subseteq X$ can be equivalently described by its indicator function

$$\begin{align}
\chi_Y : X &\to \{0, 1\}
\\ x &\mapsto \begin{cases}1 \text{ if } x \in Y \\ 0 \text{ if } x \notin Y\end{cases}
\end{align}$$

Informally, subsets of $X$ can be identified with functions $X \to \{0, 1\}$. A subobject classifier $\Omega$ of a category $\mathcal{C}$ is an object which plays a similar role as $\{0, 1\}$ does in the category of sets: subobjects of an object $X$ can be identified with morphisms from $X$ to the subobject classifier. To recover the subset with indicator function $\chi$ in a “purely categorical way”, one can take a pullback

$$\begin{array}{lcl}
& Y & \rightarrow & \{1\} & \\
& \downarrow && \downarrow \\
& X & \underset{\chi}\rightarrow & \{0, 1\} & \\
\end{array}$$

where the function from $\{1\}$ to $\{0, 1\}$ is the inclusion map. Indeed, the subset $Y := \{x \in X \mid \chi(x) = 1\}$, equipped with the inclusion map $Y \to X$ (and the unique, constant map $Y \to \{1\}$) is such a pullback because it has the correct universal property since a map into $X$ which gives the constant function 1 when composed with $\chi$ is the same as a map into $Y$.

== Definition ==
Let $\mathcal{C}$ be a finitely complete category (we denote the terminal object by $1$). A subobject classifier in $\mathcal{C}$ is an object $\Omega$ together with a monomorphism $\operatorname{true} : 1 \hookrightarrow \Omega$ (Note: Every morphism out of the terminal object is automatically a monomorphism. This condition is included as a reminder that any pullback of $\operatorname{true}$ will be a monomorphism.) such that every monomorphism is uniquely a pullback of $\operatorname{true}$. This means that for every monomorphism $\iota : Y \hookrightarrow X$, there exists a unique morphism $\chi_\iota : X \to \Omega$, called the characteristic function or classifying map of $\iota$, such that the following diagram is a pullback square (where $!$ denotes the unique morphism into the terminal object $1$):

Equivalently (assuming $\mathcal{C}$ is locally small), a subobject classifier is an object $\Omega$ which represents the subobject functor $\operatorname{Sub} : \mathcal{C}^\operatorname{op} \to \operatorname{Set}$. That is, there exists a bijection, natural in $X \in \mathcal{C}$, between subobjects of $X$ and morphisms $X \to \Omega$. When starting from this definition, one can recover the monomorphism $\operatorname{true} : 1 \hookrightarrow \Omega$ as the subobject of $\Omega$ corresponding to the morphism $\operatorname{id} : \Omega \to \Omega$.

== Further examples ==
=== Sheaves of sets ===
The category of sheaves of sets on a topological space X has a subobject classifier Ω which can be described as follows: For any open set U of X, Ω(U) is the set of all open subsets of U. The terminal object is the sheaf 1 which assigns the singleton {*} to every open set U of X. The morphism η:1 → Ω is given by the family of maps η_{U} : 1(U) → Ω(U) defined by η_{U}(*)=U for every open set U of X. Given a sheaf F on X and a sub-sheaf j: G → F, the classifying morphism χ_{j} : F → Ω is given by the family of maps χ_{j,U} : F(U) → Ω(U), where χ_{j,U}(x) is the union of all open sets V of U such that the restriction of x to V (in the sense of sheaves) is contained in j_{V}(G(V)).

Roughly speaking an assertion inside this topos is variably true or false, and its truth value from the viewpoint of an open subset U is the open subset of U where the assertion is true.

=== Presheaves ===
Given a small category $C$, the category of presheaves $\mathrm{Set}^{C^{op}}$ (i.e. the functor category consisting of all contravariant functors from $C$ to $\mathrm{Set}$) has a subobject classifer given by the functor sending any $c \in C$ to the set of sieves on $c$. The classifying morphisms are constructed quite similarly to the ones in the sheaves-of-sets example above.

=== Elementary topoi ===
Both examples above are subsumed by the following general fact: every elementary topos, defined as a category with finite limits and power objects, necessarily has a subobject classifier. The two examples above are Grothendieck topoi, and every Grothendieck topos is an elementary topos.

== See also ==
- Quasitopos, a type of category with a strong subobject classifier, which only classifies strong subobjects
