= Preradical =

Subfunctor in mathematics

In mathematics, a preradical is a subfunctor of the identity functor in the category of left modules over a ring with identity. The class of all preradicals over R-mod is denoted by R-pr. There is a natural order in R-pr given by, for any two preradicals $\sigma$ and $\tau$, $\sigma\leq\tau$, if for any left R-module M, $\sigma M\leq \tau M$. With this order R-pr becomes a big lattice.
