= Condensed mathematics =

Area of mathematics using condensed sets

Condensed mathematics is a theory developed by Dustin Clausen and Peter Scholze which replaces a topological space by a certain sheaf of sets, in order to solve some technical problems of doing homological algebra on topological groups.

Essentially the same notion was also introduced by Barwick and Haine under the name pyknotic set.

The theory aims to unify various mathematical subfields, including topology, complex geometry, and algebraic geometry. In particular, Kiran Kedlaya described condensed mathematics as "technology for doing commutative algebra over topological rings."

== Idea ==
The fundamental idea in the development of the theory is given by replacing topological spaces by condensed sets, defined below. The category of condensed sets, as well as related categories such as that of condensed abelian groups, are much better behaved than the category of topological spaces. In particular, unlike the category of topological abelian groups, the category of condensed abelian groups is an abelian category, which allows for the use of tools from homological algebra in the study of those structures.

The framework of condensed mathematics turns out to be general enough that, by considering various "spaces" with sheaves valued in condensed algebras, one might expect to be able to incorporate algebraic geometry, p-adic analytic geometry and complex analytic geometry.

=== Liquid vector space ===
In condensed mathematics, liquid vector spaces are alternatives to complete topological vector spaces, the category of which has better abstract properties than that of complete topological vector spaces. This allows for more abstract approaches using tools such as abelian categories.

== Definition ==
A condensed set is a sheaf of sets on the site of profinite sets, with the Grothendieck topology given by finite, jointly surjective collections of maps. Similarly, a condensed group, condensed ring, etc. is defined as a sheaf of groups, rings etc. on this site.

To any topological space $X$ one can associate a condensed set, customarily denoted $\underline X$, which to any profinite set $S$ associates the set of continuous maps $S\to X$. If $X$ is a topological group or ring, then $\underline X$ is a condensed group or ring.

== History ==
In 2013, Bhargav Bhatt and Peter Scholze introduced a general notion of pro-étale site associated to an arbitrary scheme. In 2018, Dustin Clausen and Scholze arrived at the conclusion that the pro-étale site of a single point, which is isomorphic to the site of profinite sets introduced above, already has rich enough structure to realize large classes of topological spaces as sheaves on it. Further developments have led to a theory of condensed sets and solid abelian groups, through which one is able to incorporate non-Archimedean geometry into the theory.

In 2020 Scholze completed a proof of their results which would enable the incorporation of functional analysis as well as complex geometry into the condensed mathematics framework, using the notion of liquid vector spaces. The argument has turned out to be quite subtle, and to get rid of any doubts about the validity of the result, he asked other mathematicians to provide a formalized and verified proof. Over a 6-month period, a group led by Johan Commelin verified the central part of the proof using the proof assistant Lean. As of 14 July 2022, the proof has been completed.

Coincidentally, in 2019 Barwick and Haine introduced a similar theory of pyknotic objects. This theory is very closely related to that of condensed sets, with the main differences being set-theoretic in nature: pyknotic theory depends on a choice of Grothendieck universes, whereas condensed mathematics can be developed strictly within ZFC.

== See also ==
- Generalized space
- Pyknotic set
