= History of topos theory =

This article gives some very general background to the mathematical idea of topos. This is an aspect of category theory, and has a reputation for being abstruse. The level of abstraction involved cannot be reduced beyond a certain point; but on the other hand context can be given. This is partly in terms of historical development, but also to some extent an explanation of differing attitudes to category theory.

== In the school of Grothendieck ==
During the latter part of the 1950s, the foundations of algebraic geometry were being rewritten; and it is here that the origins of the topos concept are to be found. At that time the Weil conjectures were an outstanding motivation to research. As we now know, the route towards their proof, and other advances, lay in the construction of étale cohomology.

With the benefit of hindsight, it can be said that algebraic geometry had been wrestling with two problems for a long time. The first was to do with its points: back in the days of projective geometry it was clear that the absence of 'enough' points on an algebraic variety was a barrier to having a good geometric theory (in which it was somewhat like a compact manifold). There was also the difficulty, that was clear as soon as topology took form in the first half of the twentieth century, that the topology of algebraic varieties had 'too few' open sets.

The question of points was close to resolution by 1950; Alexander Grothendieck took a sweeping step (invoking the Yoneda lemma) that disposed of it—naturally at a cost, that every variety or more general scheme should become a functor. It wasn't possible to add open sets, though. The way forward was otherwise.

The topos definition first appeared somewhat obliquely, in or about 1960. General problems of so-called 'descent' in algebraic geometry were considered, at the same period when the fundamental group was generalised to the algebraic geometry setting (as a pro-finite group). In the light of later work (c. 1970), 'descent' is part of the theory of comonads; here we can see one way in which the Grothendieck school bifurcates in its approach from the 'pure' category theorists, a theme that is important for the understanding of how the topos concept was later treated.

There was perhaps a more direct route available: the abelian category concept had been introduced by Grothendieck in his foundational work on homological algebra, to unify categories of sheaves of abelian groups, and of modules. An abelian category is supposed to be closed under certain category-theoretic operations—by using this kind of definition one can focus entirely on structure, saying nothing at all about the nature of the objects involved. This type of definition can be traced back, in one line, to the lattice concept of the 1930s. It was a possible question to ask, around 1957, for a purely category-theoretic characterisation of categories of sheaves of sets, the case of sheaves of abelian groups having been subsumed by Grothendieck's work (the Tôhoku paper).

Such a definition of a topos was eventually given five years later, around 1962, by Grothendieck and Verdier (see Verdier's Nicolas Bourbaki seminar Analysis Situs). The characterisation was by means of categories 'with enough colimits', and applied to what is now called a Grothendieck topos. The theory was rounded out by establishing that a Grothendieck topos was a category of sheaves, where now the word sheaf had acquired an extended meaning, since it involved a Grothendieck topology.

The idea of a Grothendieck topology (also known as a site) has been characterised by John Tate as a bold pun on the two senses of Riemann surface. Technically speaking it enabled the construction of the sought-after étale cohomology (as well as other refined theories such as flat cohomology and crystalline cohomology). At this point—about 1964—the developments powered by algebraic geometry had largely run their course. The 'open set' discussion had effectively been summed up in the conclusion that varieties had a rich enough site of open sets in unramified covers of their (ordinary) Zariski-open sets.

== From pure category theory to categorical logic ==
The current definition of topos goes back to William Lawvere and Myles Tierney. While the timing follows closely on from that described above, as a matter of history, the attitude is different, and the definition is more inclusive. That is, there are examples of toposes that are not a Grothendieck topos. What is more, these may be of interest for a number of logical disciplines.

Lawvere and Tierney's definition picks out the central role in topos theory of the sub-object classifier. In the usual category of sets, this is the two-element set of Boolean truth-values, true and false. It is almost tautologous to say that the subsets of a given set X are the same as (just as good as) the functions on X to any such given two-element set: fix the 'first' element and make a subset Y correspond to the function sending Y there and its complement in X to the other element.

Now sub-object classifiers can be found in sheaf theory. Still tautologously, though certainly more abstractly, for a topological space X there is a direct description of a sheaf on X that plays the role with respect to all sheaves of sets on X. Its set of sections over an open set U of X is just the set of open subsets of U. The space associated with a sheaf, for it, is more difficult to describe.

Lawvere and Tierney therefore formulated axioms for a topos that assumed a sub-object classifier, and some limit conditions (to make a cartesian-closed category, at least). For a while this notion of topos was called 'elementary topos'.

Once the idea of a connection with logic was formulated, there were several developments 'testing' the new theory:

- models of set theory corresponding to proofs of the independence of the axiom of choice and continuum hypothesis by Paul Cohen's method of forcing.
- recognition of the connection with Kripke semantics, the intuitionistic existential quantifier and intuitionistic type theory.
- combining these, discussion of the intuitionistic theory of real numbers, by sheaf models.

== Position of topos theory ==
There was some irony that in the pushing through of David Hilbert's long-range programme a natural home for intuitionistic logic's central ideas was found: Hilbert had detested the school of L. E. J. Brouwer. Existence as 'local' existence in the sheaf-theoretic sense, now going by the name of Kripke–Joyal semantics, is a good match. On the other hand Brouwer's long efforts on 'species', as he called the intuitionistic theory of reals, are presumably in some way subsumed and deprived of status beyond the historical. There is a theory of the real numbers in each topos, and so no one master intuitionist theory.

The later work on étale cohomology has tended to suggest that the full, general topos theory isn't required. On the other hand, other sites are used, and the Grothendieck topos has taken its place within homological algebra.

The Lawvere programme was to write higher-order logic in terms of category theory. That this can be done cleanly is shown by the book treatment by Joachim Lambek and P. J. Scott. What results is essentially an intuitionistic (i.e. constructive logic) theory, its content being clarified by the existence of a free topos. That is a set theory, in a broad sense, but also something belonging to the realm of pure syntax. The structure on its sub-object classifier is that of a Heyting algebra. To get a more classical set theory one can look at toposes in which it is moreover a Boolean algebra, or specialising even further, at those with just two truth-values. In that book, the talk is about constructive mathematics; but in fact this can be read as foundational computer science (which is not mentioned). If one wants to discuss set-theoretic operations, such as the formation of the image (range) of a function, a topos is guaranteed to be able to express this, entirely constructively.

It also produced a more accessible spin-off in pointless topology, where the locale concept isolates some insights found by treating topos as a significant development of topological space. The slogan is 'points come later': this brings discussion full circle on this page. The point of view is written up in Peter Johnstone's Stone Spaces, which has been called by a leader in the field of computer science 'a treatise on extensionality'. The extensional is treated in mathematics as ambient—it is not something about which mathematicians really expect to have a theory. Perhaps this is why topos theory has been treated as an oddity; it goes beyond what the traditionally geometric way of thinking allows. The needs of thoroughly intensional theories such as untyped lambda calculus have been met in denotational semantics. Topos theory has long looked like a possible 'master theory' in this area.

== Summary ==
The topos concept arose in algebraic geometry, as a consequence of combining the concept of sheaf and closure under categorical operations. It plays a certain definite role in cohomology theories. A 'killer application' is étale cohomology.

The subsequent developments associated with logic are more interdisciplinary. They include examples drawing on homotopy theory (classifying toposes). They involve links between category theory and mathematical logic, and also (as a high-level, organisational discussion) between category theory and theoretical computer science based on type theory. Granted the general view of Saunders Mac Lane about ubiquity of concepts, this gives them a definite status. The use of toposes as unifying bridges in mathematics has been pioneered by Olivia Caramello in her 2017 book.
