= Deligne's completeness theorem =

In mathematics, Deligne's completeness theorem says a coherent topos has enough points. It was first introduced by Pierre Deligne in SGA 4.

In 1970s, the category theorist William Lawvere observed that Deligne's theorem implies the Gödel completeness theorem.

== See also ==
- Barr's theorem
