= Coherent topos =

In mathematics, a coherent topos is a topos generated by a collection of quasi-compact quasi-separated objects closed under finite products.

Deligne's completeness theorem says a coherent topos has enough points.

== See also ==
- Spectral space
- Pyknotic set
