= Power object =

In category theory, a branch of mathematics, a power object in a category is an analogue of a powerset in the category of sets.

== Definition ==
Let $\mathcal{C}$ be a finitely complete category. A power object of $A \in \mathcal{C}$ is an object $\mathcal{P}(A)$ together with a subobject $(\in) \hookrightarrow A \times \mathcal{P}(A)$ satisfying the following universal property: for every other object $B \in \mathcal{C}$ and subobject $R \hookrightarrow B \times A$, there exists a unique morphism $\chi : B \to \mathcal{P}(A)$ such that $R \hookrightarrow B \times A$ is the pullback of $(\in) \hookrightarrow A \times \mathcal{P}(A)$ along $\chi$.

== Properties ==
In the category of sets, power objects exist: $\mathcal{P}(A)$ is the usual power set of $A$, and $(\in) \hookrightarrow A \times \mathcal{P}(A)$ is the set membership relation.

More generally, in any elementary topos, the power object of $A$ can be constructed as $\mathcal{P}(A) := \Omega^A$ (where $\Omega$ is the subobject classifier), with $(\in) \hookrightarrow A \times \Omega^A$ being the subobject classified by the evaluation map $A \times \Omega^A \to \Omega$.

Conversely, every finitely complete category with power objects is an elementary topos. Thus, power objects provide a possible simplification of the definition of an elementary topos.
