= Quasitopos =

Generalization of a topos in mathematics

In mathematics, specifically category theory, a quasitopos is a generalization of a topos. A topos has a subobject classifier classifying all subobjects, but in a quasitopos, only strong subobjects are classified. Quasitoposes are also required to be finitely cocomplete and locally cartesian closed. A solid quasitopos is one for which 0 is a strong subobject of 1.
