= Partial combinatory algebra =

In theoretical computer science and mathematical logic, specifically in realizability, a partial combinatory algebra (pca) is an algebraic structure which abstracts a model of computation. The definition of pcas uses an idea from combinatory logic. The realizability topos over a pca is a model of higher-order intuitionistic logic where informally every function is computable in the model of computation specified by the pca.

== Definition ==
A partial applicative structure is simply a set $A$ equipped with a partial binary operation $A \times A \rightharpoonup A$ called application. In the context of realizability, this operation is usually denoted by simple juxtaposition, i.e., $(a, b) \mapsto a b$. It is usually not associative; by convention, the notation $a b c$ associates to the left as $(a b) c$, matching the standard convention in λ-calculus.

The terms (or expressions) over a partial applicative structure $A$ are defined inductively:

- A constant $a \in A$ is an expression,
- A variable, from some fixed, countably infinite set of variables, is an expression,
- If $e_1$ and $e_2$ are expressions, then $e_1 e_2$ is an expression.

(In other words, they form the free magma over the disjoint union $A + V$ where $V$ is the set of variables.)

A term is closed when it contains no variables. A closed term may be evaluated in the natural way: a constant $a \in A$ evaluates to itself, and if the terms $e_1$ and $e_2$ respectively evaluate to $a_1$ and $a_2$, then $e_1 e_2$ evaluates to $a_1 a_2$, if this is defined. Note that the evaluation is a partial operation, since not all applications are defined. We write $t \downarrow$ to simultaneously express that the term $t$ evaluates to a defined value and denote this value (this matches standard notation for values of partial functions). We also write $t \simeq u$ when both closed terms $t$ and $u$ either do not evaluate to a defined value, or evaluate to the same value.

A substitution operation is also defined in the natural way: if $t$ is a term, $x$ is a variable and $u$ is another term, $t[u/x]$ denotes the term $t$ with all occurrences of $x$ replaced by $u$.

The partial applicative structure A is said to be combinatory complete or functionally complete if, for every term $t(x_0, \dots, x_n)$ (that is, a term $t$ whose variables are among $x_0, \dots, x_n$), there exists an element $a \in A$ such that:

- $a a_0 \dots a_{n-1} \downarrow$ for all $a_0, \dots, a_{n-1} \in A$,
- $a a_0 \dots a_n \simeq t[a_0/x_0, \dots, a_n/x_n]$ for all $a_0, \dots, a_n \in A$.

A partial combinatory algebra (pca) is a combinatory complete partial applicative structure. A total combinatory algebra (tca) is a pca whose application operation is total.

Informally, the combinatory completeness condition requires an analogue of the abstraction operation from lambda calculus to exist inside the pca.

== Characterization by combinators ==
In the same way as there is a translation from λ-terms to terms of the SKI combinator calculus by eliminating λ-abstractions using combinators, pcas can be characterized by the existence of elements which satisfy equations analogous to the S and K combinators. Note, however, that some care must be taken in the statement and proof since application is not always defined in a pca.

Theorem: A partial applicative structure $A$ is combinatory complete if and only if there exist two elements $k, s \in A$ such that:

- $K x y \downarrow = x$ for all $x, y \in A$,
- $S x y \downarrow$ for all $x, y \in A$,
- $S x y z \simeq (x z) (y z)$ for all $x, y, z \in A$.

For the proof, in the forward direction, if $A$ is combinatory complete, it suffices to apply the definition of combinatory completeness to the terms $t_K(x, y) := x$ and $t_S(x, y, z) := (x z)(y z)$ to obtain $K$ and $S$ with the required properties.

It is the converse that involves abstraction elimination. Assume we have $K$ and $S$ as stated. Given a variable $x$ and a term $t$, we define a term $\langle x \rangle t$ whose variables are those of $t$ minus $x$, which plays a role similar to $\lambda x \cdot t$ in λ-calculus. The definition is by induction on $t$ as follows:

- $\langle x \rangle a = K a$ for a constant $a \in A$,
- $\langle x \rangle x = I$ where $I := S K K$,
- $\langle x \rangle y = K y$ if $y$ is a variable different from $x$,
- $\langle x \rangle (u v) = S (\langle x \rangle u) (\langle x \rangle v)$.

Beware that the analogy between $\langle x \rangle t$ and $\lambda x \cdot t$ is not perfect. For example, the terms $(\langle x \rangle t) t'$ and $t[t'/x]$ are not generally equivalent in a reasonable sense, e.g., taking a variable $y$ different from $x$ and $a, b \in A$ constants, we have $(\langle x \rangle y)(a b) = K y (a b)$, which cannot be considered equivalent to $y$ because the latter always evaluates to $c$ if $y$ is replaced by a constant $c \in A$, while the former may not as $a b$ may be undefined.

However, if $t'$ is a constant $a$, then $(\langle x \rangle t) a$ is indeed equivalent to $t[a/x]$ in the sense that substituting all variables for some constants in these two terms gives the same result (per $\simeq$).

Moreover, substituting variables by constants in $\langle x \rangle t$ always evaluates to a defined result, even if this would not be the case by substituting variables in $t$. For example, if $a, b \in A$ are two constants, the term $\langle x \rangle (a b)$ (abstracting a variable which does not appear) is equal to $S (K a) (K b)$. By the assumptions on $K$ and $S$, this is well-defined, even though $a b$ may not be well-defined.

These remarks imply that for all term $t(x_0, \dots, x_n)$, the value $a := \langle x_0 \rangle \dots \langle x_n \rangle t \downarrow$ is well-defined and satisfies the two requirements of combinatory completeness.

== Examples ==
=== First Kleene algebra ===
The first Kleene algebra $\mathcal{K}_1$ consists of the set $\mathbb{N}$ with application $a b := \phi_a(b)$, where $\phi_a$ denotes the $a$-th partial recursive function in a standard Gödel numbering.

This pca can also be relativized to an oracle $D \subseteq \mathbb{N}$: we define a pca $\mathcal{K}_1^D$ with carrier $\mathbb{N}$ by setting $a b := \phi^D_a(b)$, where $\phi^D_a$ is the $a$-th partial recursive function with oracle $D$.

=== Untyped λ-calculus ===
We can form a pca (in fact a tca) by quotienting the set of closed (untyped) λ-terms by β-equivalence and taking the application to be the one inherited from λ-calculus.
