= Pro-simplicial set =

In mathematics, a pro-simplicial set is an inverse system of simplicial sets.

A pro-simplicial set is called pro-finite if each term of the inverse system of simplicial sets has finite homotopy groups.

Pro-simplicial sets show up in shape theory, in the study of localization and completion in homotopy theory, and in the study of homotopy properties of schemes (e.g. étale homotopy theory).
