= Dustin Clausen =

American-Canadian mathematician

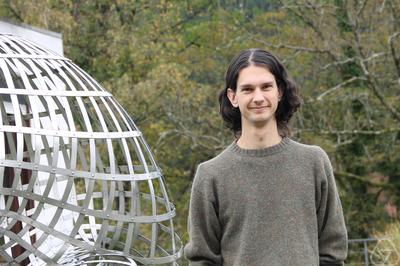
- Dustin Clausen at Oberwolfach in 2019.
- Education: Harvard University (AB); Independent University of Moscow; Massachusetts Institute of Technology (PhD)
- Known for: Condensed mathematics
- Awards: NSF Graduate Research Fellowship (2008); David Mumford Prize (2008); Hoopes Prize (2008); Hartmann Foundation's Diploma Prize (2022)
- Scientific career
- Fields: Algebraic K-theory; Number theory Homotopy theory
- Institutions: MPIM Bonn; University of Copenhagen; IHÉS
- Thesis: Arithmetic Duality in Algebraic K-Theory
- Doctoral advisor: Jacob Lurie

Dustin Clausen is an American-Canadian mathematician known for his contributions to algebraic K-theory and the development of condensed mathematics, in collaboration with Peter Scholze. His research interests include the intersections of number theory and homotopy theory.

== Early life and education ==
Dustin Clausen completed his undergraduate studies at Harvard University. While at Harvard he spent a semester studying at the Math in Moscow program. He received his PhD in 2013 from the Massachusetts Institute of Technology (MIT), where he was supervised by Jacob Lurie. His doctoral thesis was titled "Arithmetic Duality in Algebraic K-Theory."

== Academic career ==
After earning his PhD, Clausen spent five years as a postdoctoral researcher at the University of Copenhagen. He then moved to Bonn, Germany, where he was first a postdoctoral researcher at the University of Bonn and then the head of a research group at the Max Planck Institute for Mathematics. In 2020, Clausen returned to the University of Copenhagen as an associate professor. Since 2023, he has held a position as a permanent professor at the Institut des Hautes Études Scientifiques (IHÉS).

== Research and contributions ==
Clausen's research has focused on algebraic K-theory and its connections to number theory and homotopy theory. Along with Peter Scholze, he has developed the concept of condensed mathematics, which aims to provide a framework for topological algebraic structures.

== Awards and honors ==
- NSF Graduate Research Fellowship (2008)
- David Mumford Prize (2008)
- Hoopes Prize (2008)
- Hartmann Foundation's Diploma Prize (2022)

== Personal life ==
Dustin Clausen is the grandson of mathematician John T. Tate (1925–2019), and the great grandson of Emil Artin.
