= Subfunctor =

In category theory, a branch of mathematics, a subfunctor is a special type of functor that is an analogue of a subset.

== Definition ==
Let $\mathcal{C}$ be a category, and let $F$ be a contravariant functor from $\mathcal{C}$ to the category of sets Set. A contravariant functor $G$ from $\mathcal{C}$ to Set is a subfunctor of F if

1. For all objects c of $\mathcal{C}$, $G(c) \subseteq F(c)$, and
2. For all arrows $f: c' \rightarrow c$ of $\mathcal{C}$, $G(f)$ is the restriction of $F(f)$ to $G(c')$.

This relation is often written as $G \subseteq F$.

For example, let 1 be the category with a single object and a single arrow. A functor F: 1 → Set maps the unique object of 1 to some set S and the unique identity arrow of 1 to the identity function 1_{S} on S. A subfunctor G of F maps the unique object of 1 to a subset T of S and maps the unique identity arrow to the identity function 1_{T} on T. Notice that 1_{T} is the restriction of 1_{S} to T. Consequently, subfunctors of F correspond to subsets of S.

== Remarks ==
Subfunctors in general are like global versions of subsets. For example, if one imagines the objects of some category C to be analogous to the open sets of a topological space, then a contravariant functor from C to the category of sets gives a set-valued presheaf on C, that is, it associates sets to the objects of C in a way that is compatible with the arrows of C. A subfunctor then associates a subset to each set, again in a compatible way.

The most important examples of subfunctors are subfunctors of the Hom functor. Let c be an object of the category C, and consider the functor Hom(−, c). This functor takes an object c′ of C and gives back all of the morphisms c′ → c. A subfunctor of Hom(−, c) gives back only some of the morphisms. Such a subfunctor is called a sieve, and it is usually used when defining Grothendieck topologies.

== Open subfunctors ==
Subfunctors are also used in the construction of representable functors on the category of ringed spaces. Let F be a contravariant functor from the category of ringed spaces to the category of sets, and let G ⊆ F. Suppose that this inclusion morphism G → F is representable by open immersions, i.e., for any representable functor Hom(−, X) and any morphism Hom(−, X) → F, the fibered product G×_{F}Hom(−, X) is a representable functor Hom(−, Y) and the morphism Y → X defined by the Yoneda lemma is an open immersion. Then G is called an open subfunctor of F. If F is covered by representable open subfunctors, then, under certain conditions, it can be shown that F is representable. This is a useful technique for the construction of ringed spaces. It was discovered and exploited heavily by Alexander Grothendieck, who applied it especially to the case of schemes. For a formal statement and proof, see Grothendieck, Éléments de géométrie algébrique, vol. 1, 2nd ed., chapter 0, section 4.5.
