= Peter Johnstone (mathematician) =

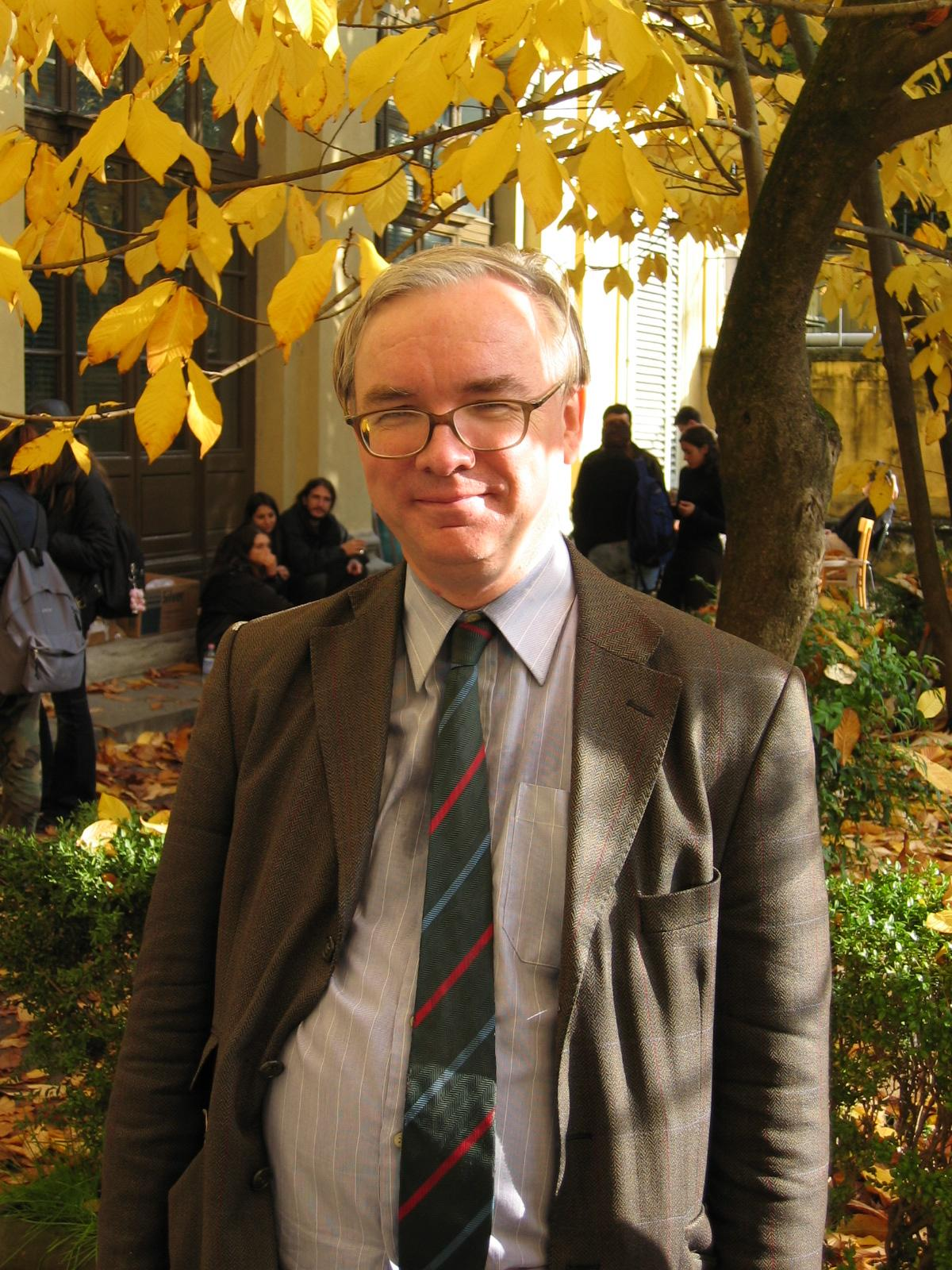
- Johnstone in 2003
- Born: 28 December 1948 (age 77)
- Education: University of Cambridge
- Known for: Category theory Topos theory Logic
- Awards: Whitehead Prize (1979)
- Scientific career
- Fields: Mathematics
- Thesis: Some Aspects of Internal Category Theory in an Elementary Topos (1974)
- Doctoral advisor: John Frank Adams

Peter Tennant Johnstone (born 28 December 1948) is Professor of the Foundations of Mathematics at the University of Cambridge, and a fellow of St. John's College. He invented or developed a broad range of fundamental ideas in topos theory. His thesis, completed at the University of Cambridge in 1974, was entitled "Some Aspects of Internal Category Theory in an Elementary Topos".

Peter Johnstone is a choral singer, having sung for over thirty years with the Cambridge University Musical Society and since 2004 with the (London) Bach Choir. Following a severe bout of COVID-19 in 2020, he was invited by the Bach Choir's musical director David Hill to provide the text for a new choral work about the pandemic which the Choir commissioned from the composer Richard Blackford; the piece, `Vision of a Garden', was performed at the Bach Choir's first post-lockdown concert in October 2021 in the Royal Festival Hall, London, and again in July 2023 in King's College Chapel, Cambridge.

He is a great-great-great nephew of the Reverend George Gilfillan who was eulogised in William McGonagall's first poem.

== Books ==
- Johnstone, Peter (1977), Topos Theory, Academic Press, ISBN 978-0-12-387850-2, Zbl 0368.18001.

— "[F]ar too hard to read, and not for the faint-hearted"

- Johnstone, Peter (1982), Stone Spaces, Cambridge University Press, ISBN 978-0-521-33779-3, Zbl 0499.54001.
- Johnstone, Peter (1987), Notes on Logic and Set Theory, Cambridge University Press, ISBN 978-0-521-33692-5.
- Johnstone, Peter (2002), Sketches of an Elephant: A Topos Theory Compendium. I, II, Oxford University Press, ISBN 978-0-19-852496-0, Zbl 1071.18002 (v.3 in preparation)
