= Topos =

Type of category in mathematics

In mathematics, a Grothendieck topos (US: /ˈtɒpɒs/, UK: /ˈtoʊpoʊs, ˈtoʊpɒs/; plural topoi /ˈtɒpɔɪ/ or /ˈtoʊpɔɪ/, or toposes) is a category that behaves like the category of sheaves of sets on a topological space (or more generally, on a site). Topoi behave much like the category of sets and possess a notion of localization. Grothendieck topoi find applications in algebraic geometry. They are generalized by elementary topoi, which are used in logic.

The mathematical field that studies topoi is called topos theory.

== Introduction ==
Since the introduction of sheaves into mathematics in the 1940s, a major theme has been to study a space by studying sheaves on a space. This idea was expounded by Alexander Grothendieck by introducing the notion of a "topos". The main utility of this notion is in the abundance of situations in mathematics where topological heuristics are very effective, but an honest topological space is lacking; it is sometimes possible to find a topos formalizing the heuristic. An important example of this programmatic idea is the étale topos of a scheme. Another illustration of the capability of Grothendieck topoi to incarnate the “essence” of different mathematical situations is given by their use as "bridges" for connecting theories which, albeit written in possibly very different languages, share a common mathematical content.

== Equivalent definitions ==
A Grothendieck topos is a category $C$ which satisfies any one of the following three properties. (A theorem of Jean Giraud states that the properties below are all equivalent.)

- There is a small category $D$ and an inclusion $C\hookrightarrow \operatorname{Presh}(D)$ that admits a finite-limit-preserving left adjoint.
- $C$ is the category of sheaves on a Grothendieck site.
- $C$ satisfies Giraud's axioms, below.

Here $\operatorname{Presh}(D)$ denotes the category of contravariant functors from $D$ to the category of sets; such a contravariant functor is frequently called a presheaf.

=== Giraud's axioms ===
Giraud's axioms for a category $C$ are:

- $C$ has a small set of generators, and admits all small colimits. Furthermore, fiber products distribute over coproducts; that is, given a set $I$, an $I$-indexed coproduct mapping to $A$, and a morphism $A'\to A$, the pullback is an $I$-indexed coproduct of the pullbacks:
  $$\left(\coprod_{i\in I} B_i\right)\times_A A'\cong\coprod_{i\in I}(B_i\times_A A').$$
- Sums in $C$ are disjoint. In other words, the fiber product of $X$ and $Y$ over their sum is the initial object in $C$.
- All equivalence relations in $C$ are effective.

The last axiom needs the most explanation. If X is an object of C, an "equivalence relation" R on X is a map R → X × X in C such that for any object Y in C, the induced map Hom(Y, R) → Hom(Y, X) × Hom(Y, X) gives an ordinary equivalence relation on the set Hom(Y, X). Since C has colimits we may form the coequalizer of the two maps R → X; call this X/R. The equivalence relation is "effective" if the canonical map

$$R \to X \times_{X/R} X \,\!$$

is an isomorphism.

== Examples ==
Giraud's theorem already gives "sheaves on sites" as a complete list of examples. Note, however, that nonequivalent sites often give rise to equivalent topoi. As indicated in the introduction, sheaves on ordinary topological spaces motivate many of the basic definitions and results of topos theory.

=== Category of sets and G-sets ===
The category of sets is an important special case: it plays the role of a point in topos theory. Indeed, a set may be thought of as a sheaf on a point since functors on the singleton category with a single object and only the identity morphism are just specific sets in the category of sets.

Similarly, there is a topos $BG$ for any group $G$ which is equivalent to the category of $G$-sets. We construct this as the category of presheaves on the category with one object, but now the set of morphisms is given by the group $G$. Since any functor must give a $G$-action on the target, this gives the category of $G$-sets. Similarly, for a groupoid $\mathcal{G}$ the category of presheaves on $\mathcal{G}$ gives a collection of sets indexed by the set of objects in $\mathcal{G}$, and the automorphisms of an object in $\mathcal{G}$ has an action on the target of the functor.

=== Topoi from ringed spaces ===
More exotic examples, and the raison d'être of topos theory, come from algebraic geometry. The basic example of a topos comes from the Zariski topos of a scheme. For each scheme $X$ there is a site $\text{Open}(X)$ (of objects given by open subsets and morphisms given by inclusions) whose category of presheaves forms the Zariski topos $(X)_{Zar}$. But once distinguished classes of morphisms are considered, there are multiple generalizations of this which leads to non-trivial mathematics. Moreover, topoi give the foundations for studying schemes purely as functors on the category of algebras.

To a scheme and even a stack one may associate an étale topos, an fppf topos, or a Nisnevich topos. Another important example of a topos is from the crystalline site. In the case of the étale topos, these form the foundational objects of study in anabelian geometry, which studies objects in algebraic geometry that are determined entirely by the structure of their étale fundamental group.

=== Pathologies ===
Topos theory is, in some sense, a generalization of classical point-set topology. One should therefore expect to see old and new instances of pathological behavior. For instance, there is an example due to Pierre Deligne of a nontrivial topos that has no points (see below for the definition of points of a topos).

== Geometric morphisms ==
If $X$ and $Y$ are topoi, a geometric morphism $u:X\to Y$ is a pair of adjoint functors (u^{∗},u_{∗}) (where u^{∗} : Y → X is left adjoint to u_{∗} : X → Y) such that u^{∗} preserves finite limits. Note that u^{∗} automatically preserves colimits by virtue of having a right adjoint.

By Freyd's adjoint functor theorem, to give a geometric morphism X → Y is to give a functor u^{∗}: Y → X that preserves finite limits and all small colimits. Thus geometric morphisms between topoi may be seen as analogues of maps of locales.

If $X$ and $Y$ are topological spaces and $u$ is a continuous map between them, then the pullback and pushforward operations on sheaves yield a geometric morphism between the associated topoi for the sites $\text{Open}(X),\text{Open}(Y)$.

=== Points of topoi ===
A point of a topos $X$ is defined as a geometric morphism from the topos of sets to $X$.

If X is an ordinary space and x is a point of X, then the functor that takes a sheaf F to its stalk F_{x} has a right adjoint (the "skyscraper sheaf" functor), so an ordinary point of X also determines a topos-theoretic point. These may be constructed as the pullback-pushforward along the continuous map x: 1 → X.

For the etale topos $(X)_{et}$ of a space $X$, a point is a bit more refined of an object. Given a point $x:\text{Spec}(\kappa(x)) \to X$ of the underlying scheme $X$ a point $x'$ of the topos $(X)_{et}$ is then given by a separable field extension $k$ of $\kappa(x)$ such that the associated map $x':\text{Spec}(k) \to X$ factors through the original point $x$. Then, the factorization map
$$\text{Spec}(k) \to \text{Spec}(\kappa(x))$$
is an etale morphism of schemes.

More precisely, those are the global points. They are not adequate in themselves for displaying the space-like aspect of a topos, because a non-trivial topos may fail to have any. Generalized points are geometric morphisms from a topos Y (the stage of definition) to X. There are enough of these to display the space-like aspect. For example, if X is the classifying topos S[T] for a geometric theory T, then the universal property says that its points are the models of T (in any stage of definition Y).

=== Essential geometric morphisms ===
A geometric morphism (u^{∗},u_{∗}) is essential if u^{∗} has a further left adjoint u_{!}, or equivalently (by the adjoint functor theorem) if u^{∗} preserves not only finite but all small limits.

== Ringed topoi ==
A ringed topos is a pair (X,R), where X is a topos and R is a commutative ring object in X. Most of the constructions of ringed spaces go through for ringed topoi. The category of R-module objects in X is an abelian category with enough injectives. A more useful abelian category is the subcategory of quasi-coherent R-modules: these are R-modules that admit a presentation.

Another important class of ringed topoi, besides ringed spaces, are the étale topoi of Deligne–Mumford stacks.

== Homotopy theory of topoi ==
Michael Artin and Barry Mazur associated to the site underlying a topos a pro-simplicial set (up to homotopy). (It's better to consider it in Ho(pro-SS); see Edwards) Using this inverse system of simplicial sets one may sometimes associate to a homotopy invariant in classical topology an inverse system of invariants in topos theory. The study of the pro-simplicial set associated to the étale topos of a scheme is called étale homotopy theory. In good cases (if the scheme is Noetherian and geometrically unibranch), this pro-simplicial set is pro-finite.

== See also ==
- History of topos theory
- Homotopy hypothesis
- ∞-topos
- Quasitopos
- Geometric logic
- Generalized space
