= Pseudomonad (category theory) =

Generalization of monads

In mathematical category theory, a pseudomonad is a mathematical generalization of a monad. It is essentially the same notion as a pseudomonoid as introduced in Gray-monoid, and was introduced by Marmolejo (1997) for every Gray-category. A pseudomonad $T = T (\mu, \eta, \tau, \lambda, \rho)$ on a Gray-category or 2-category (or a more generalized notion weak 2-category) $\mathcal C$ consists of a 2-functor (in particular, if it is a functor on a weak 2-category, it is a pseudo-functor. (Note: Note that Remark 2.1. of 2-functor in nLab.)) $T: \mathcal C \rightarrow \mathcal C$ equipped with pseudonatural transformations $\mu: T^2 \rightarrow T$ and $\eta : \mathrm{Id} \rightarrow T$ which satisfy the monad laws up to coherent invertible modifications. In monads, the identity and the associativity of composition hold strictly as equalities, whereas in the axiom of pseudomonads they hold only up to isomorphism, which satisfy the coherent axioms.

Pseudomonads and their adjunctions are closely related, and this is called a pseudoadjunction. A fundamental fact in the classical theory of ordinary monads is that every adjoint pair of functors induces a monad, and that every monad is induced by an adjoint pair of functors. The two extremal solutions corresponding to this fact are the Eilenberg–Moore category on one side and the Kleisli category on the other. When considering the 2‑categorical analogue of adjoints in monads, it is still the case that every adjoint pair of functors induces a monad, but the existence of Eilenberg–Moore objects is now a completeness condition, and existence of Kleisli objects a cocompleteness condition. If the 2-category has finite limits, however, these Eilenberg–Moore objects do exist, and so every pseudomonad is still generated by an adjoint pair of functors.

The 2-categorical analogue of Beck's monadicity theorem holds for the pseudomonads. Whereas the original theorem gives a necessary and sufficient condition for an adjunction to be monadic, the 2‑categorical analogue replaces the adjunctions and monads on ordinary categories that are the subject of the original theorem by pseudo-adjunctions and pseudomonads on 2-categories. The formal theory of monads can be developed in arbitrary 2-category, but to develop a formal theory of pseudomonads, move to the Gray-category. The analogue of distributive laws between monads also applies to pseudomonads. This was explicitly introduced by Marmolejo (1999) and is called the pseudodistributive law. Initially, it was thought that nine coherence axioms sufficed for the definition of a pseudodistributive law between pseudomonads, but this was later reduced to eight.

== Definition ==
Let $C$ denotes a Gray-category or 2-category. Then a pseudomonad on $C$ consists of:

- A 1-cell is a 2-functor $T: \mathcal C \rightarrow \mathcal C$
- Two 2-cells are pseudonatural transformations $\mu: T^2 \rightarrow T$ and $\eta : \mathrm{Id} \rightarrow T$
- Three invertible 3-cells of the following form:

.

these satisfying the following two coherence conditions:

== Pseudoadjunctions ==
It is possible to define an analogue of adjunctions in Gray categories; these are known as pseudoadjunctions or pseudo-adjunctions. Every pseudoadjunction gives rise to a pseudomonad.

A pseudoadjuction $F \dashv G$ between Gray categories $\mathcal{C}$ and $\mathcal{D}$ consists of:

- Two 1-cells: the functors $F: \mathcal{C} \to \mathcal{D}$ and $G: \mathcal{D} \to \mathcal{C}$
- Two 2-cells: maps $t: \mathrm{id}_\mathcal{D} \to GF$ and $w: FG \to \mathrm{id}_\mathcal{C}$
- Two 3-cells: Invertible maps $\tau$ and $\omega$, shown by the following diagrams:

The following pasting diagrams must be equal to the identity:

== See also ==
- Doctrine
- Formal criteria for adjoint functors
