= 2-Yoneda lemma =

Result in category theory

In mathematics, especially category theory, the 2-Yoneda lemma is a generalization of the Yoneda lemma to 2-categories. Precisely, given a contravariant pseudofunctor $F$ on a category C, it says: for each object $x$ in C, the natural functor (evaluation at the identity)

$$\underline{\operatorname{Hom}}(h_x, F) \to F(x)$$

is an equivalence of categories, where $\underline{\operatorname{Hom}}(-, -)$ denotes (roughly) the category of natural transformations between pseudofunctors on C and $h_x = \operatorname{Hom}(-, x)$.

Under the Grothendieck construction, $h_x$ corresponds to the comma category $C \downarrow x$. So, the lemma is also frequently stated as:

$$F(x) \simeq \underline{\operatorname{Hom}}(C \downarrow x, F),$$

where $F$ is identified with the fibered category associated to $F$.

As an application of this lemma, the coherence theorem for bicategories holds.

== Sketch of proof ==
First we define the functor in the opposite direction

$$\mu : F(x) \to \underline{\operatorname{Hom}}(h_x, F)$$

as follows. Given an object $\overline{x}$ in $F(x)$, define the natural transformation

$$\mu(\overline{x}) : h_x \to F,$$

that is, $\mu(\overline{x})_y : \operatorname{Hom}(y, x) \to F(y),$ by

$$\mu(\overline{x})_y(f) = (Ff) \overline{x}.$$

(In the below, we shall often drop a subscript for a natural transformation.) Next, given a morphism $\varphi : \overline{x} \to x'$ in $F(x)$, for $f : y \to x$, we let $\mu(\varphi)(f)$ be

$$(Ff)\varphi : (Ff)\overline{x} \to (Ff)x'.$$

Then $\mu(\varphi) :\mu(\overline{x}) \to \mu(x')$ is a morphism (a 2-morphism to be precise or a modification in the terminology of Bénabou). The rest of the proof is then to show

1. The above $\mu$ is a functor,
2. $e \circ \mu \simeq \operatorname{id}$, where $e$ is the evaluation at the identity; i.e., $e(\lambda) = \lambda(\operatorname{id}_x),$ $e(\alpha : \lambda \to \rho) = \alpha(\operatorname{id}_x) : \lambda(\operatorname{id}_x) \to \rho(\operatorname{id}_x),$
3. $\mu \circ e \simeq \operatorname{id}.$

Claim 1 is clear. As for Claim 2,

$$e(\mu(\overline{x})) = \mu(\overline{x})(\operatorname{id}_x) = F(\operatorname{id}_x) \overline{x} \simeq \operatorname{id}_{F(x)} \overline{x} = \overline{x}$$

where the isomorphism here comes from the fact that $F$ is a pseudofunctor. Similarly,$e(\mu(\varphi)) \simeq \varphi.$ For Claim 3, we have:

$$\mu(e(\lambda))(f) = (Ff \circ \lambda)(\operatorname{id}_x) \simeq (\lambda \circ h_x f)(\operatorname{id}_x) = \lambda(f).$$

Similarly for a morphism $\alpha : \lambda \to \rho.$ $\square$

== ∞-Yoneda ==
Given an ∞-category C, let $\widehat{C} = \underline{\operatorname{Hom}}(C^{op}, \textbf{Kan})$ be the ∞-category of presheaves on it with values in Kan = the ∞-category of Kan complexes. Then the ∞-version of the Yoneda embedding $C \hookrightarrow \widehat{C}$ involves some (harmless) choice in the following way.

First, we have the hom-functor

$$\operatorname{Hom} : C^{op} \times C  \to \textbf{Kan}$$

that is characterized by a certain universal property (e.g., universal left fibration) and is unique up to a unique isomorphism in the homotopy category $\operatorname{ho}\underline{\operatorname{Hom}}(C \times C^{op}, \textbf{Kan}).$ Fix one such functor. Then we get the Yoneda embedding functor in the usual way:

$$y : C \to \widehat{C}, \, a \mapsto \operatorname{Hom}(-, a),$$

which turns out to be fully faithful (i.e., an equivalence on the Hom level). Moreover and more strongly, for each object $F$ in $\widehat{C}$ and object $a$ in $C$, the evaluation $e$ at the identity (see below)

$$\operatorname{Hom}(y(a), F) \to F(a)$$

is invertible in the ∞-category of large Kan complexes (i.e., Kan complexes living in a universe larger than the given one). Here, the evaluation map $e$ refers to the composition

$$\operatorname{Hom}(y(a), F) \overset{-(a)}\to \operatorname{Hom}(y(a)(a), F(a)) = \operatorname{Hom}(\operatorname{Hom}(a, a), F(a)) \to F(a)$$

where the last map is the restriction to the identity $\operatorname{id}_a$.

The ∞-Yoneda lemma is closely related to the matter of straightening and unstraightening.
