= Linton's theorem =

Linton's theorem may refer to:

- Linton's theorem (equational theory)
- Linton's monadicity theorem
