= Polyad =

Polyad may refer to:

- Polyad (mathematics), a generalization of monads in category theory
- Polyad (spectroscopy), a group of vibrational modes
