= Pseudoalgebra =

2-category version of algebra

In algebra, given a 2-monad T in a 2-category, a pseudoalgebra for T is a 2-category-version of algebra for T, that satisfies the laws up to coherent isomorphisms.

== See also ==
- Operad
