= Pseudomonad =

Pseudomonad may refer to:

== Biology ==
a member of:

- Pseudomonadaceae, the family.
- Pseudomonas, the genus.

== Mathematics ==
- Pseudomonad (category theory), a generalisation of a monad on a category.
