= Éléments de géométrie algébrique =

1960–67 foundational treatise on algebraic geometry by Alexander Grothendieck

- Author: Alexander Grothendieck and Jean Dieudonné
- Language: French
- Subject: Algebraic geometry
- Publisher: Institut des Hautes Études Scientifiques
- Publication date: 1960–1967

The Éléments de géométrie algébrique (EGA; from French: "Elements of Algebraic Geometry") by Alexander Grothendieck (assisted by Jean Dieudonné) is a rigorous treatise on algebraic geometry that was published (in eight parts or fascicles) from 1960 through 1967 by the Institut des Hautes Études Scientifiques. In it, Grothendieck established systematic foundations of algebraic geometry, building upon the concept of schemes, which he defined. The work is now considered the foundation and basic reference of modern algebraic geometry.

== Editions ==
Initially thirteen chapters were planned, but only the first four (making a total of approximately 1500 pages) were published. Much of the material which would have been found in the following chapters can be found, in a less polished form, in the Séminaire de géométrie algébrique (known as SGA). Indeed, as explained by Grothendieck in the preface of the published version of SGA, by 1970 it had become clear that incorporating all of the planned material in EGA would require significant changes in the earlier chapters already published, and that therefore the prospects of completing EGA in the near term were limited. An obvious example is provided by derived categories, which became an indispensable tool in the later SGA volumes, but was not yet used in EGA III as the theory was not yet developed at the time. Considerable effort was therefore spent to bring the published SGA volumes to a high degree of completeness and rigour. Before work on the treatise was abandoned, there were plans in 1966–67 to expand the group of authors to include Grothendieck's students Pierre Deligne and Michel Raynaud, as evidenced by published correspondence between Grothendieck and David Mumford. Grothendieck's letter of 4 November 1966 to Mumford also indicates that the second-edition revised structure was in place by that time, with Chapter VIII already intended to cover the Picard scheme. In that letter he estimated that at the pace of writing up to that point, the following four chapters (V to VIII) would have taken eight years to complete, indicating an intended length comparable to the first four chapters, which had been in preparation for about eight years at the time.

Grothendieck nevertheless wrote a revised version of EGA I which was published by Springer-Verlag. It updates the terminology, replacing "prescheme" by "scheme" and "scheme" by "separated scheme", and heavily emphasizes the use of representable functors. The new preface of the second edition also includes a slightly revised plan of the complete treatise, now divided into twelve chapters.

Grothendieck's EGA V deals with Bertini type theorems. Monografie Matematyczne in Poland has accepted this volume for publication, but the editing process is quite slow (as of 2010). James Milne has preserved some of the original Grothendieck notes and a translation of them into English. They may be available from his websites connected with the University of Michigan in Ann Arbor.

== Chapters ==
The following table lays out the original and revised plan of the treatise and indicates where (in SGA or elsewhere) the topics intended for the later, unpublished chapters were treated by Grothendieck and his collaborators.

#	First edition	Second edition	Comments
I	Le langage des schémas	Le langage des schémas	Second edition brings in certain schemes representing functors such as Grassmannians, presumably from intended Chapter V of the first edition. In addition, the contents of Section 1 of Chapter IV of first edition was moved to Chapter I in the second edition.
II	Étude globale élémentaire de quelques classes de morphismes	Étude globale élémentaire de quelques classes de morphismes	First edition complete, second edition did not appear.
III	Étude cohomologique des faisceaux cohérents	Cohomologie des Faisceaux algébriques cohérents. Applications.	First edition complete except for last four sections, intended for publication after Chapter IV: elementary projective duality, local cohomology and its relation to projective cohomology, and Picard groups (all but projective duality treated in SGA II).
IV	Étude locale des schémas et des morphismes de schémas	Étude locale des schémas et des morphismes de schémas	First edition essentially complete; some changes made in last sections; the section on hyperplane sections made into the new Chapter V of second edition (draft exists)
V	Procédés élémentaires de construction de schémas	Complements sur les morphismes projectifs	Did not appear. Some elementary constructions of schemes apparently intended for first edition appear in Chapter I of second edition. The existing draft of Chapter V corresponds to the second edition plan. It includes also expanded treatment of some material from SGA VII.
VI	Technique de descente. Méthode générale de construction des schémas	Techniques de construction de schémas	Did not appear. Descent theory and related construction techniques summarised by Grothendieck in FGA. By 1968 the plan had evolved to treat algebraic spaces and algebraic stacks.
VII	Schémas de groupes, espaces fibrés principaux	Schémas en groupes, espaces fibrés principaux	Did not appear. Treated in detail in SGA III.
VIII	Étude différentielle des espaces fibrés	Le schéma de Picard	Did not appear. Material apparently intended for first edition can be found in SGA III, construction and results on Picard scheme are summarised in FGA.
IX	Le groupe fondamental	Le groupe fondamental	Did not appear. Treated in detail in SGA I.
X	Résidus et dualité	Résidus et dualité	Did not appear. Treated in detail in Hartshorne's edition of Grothendieck's notes "Residues and duality"
XI	Théorie d'intersection, classes de Chern, théorème de Riemann-Roch	Théorie d'intersection, classes de Chern, théorème de Riemann-Roch	Did not appear. Treated in detail in SGA VI.
XII	Schémas abéliens et schémas de Picard	Cohomologie étale des schémas	Did not appear. Étale cohomology treated in detail in SGA IV, SGA V.
XIII	Cohomologie de Weil	none	Intended to cover étale cohomology in the first edition.

In addition to the actual chapters, an extensive "Chapter 0" on various preliminaries was divided between the volumes in which the treatise appeared. Topics treated range from category theory, sheaf theory and general topology to commutative algebra and homological algebra. The longest part of Chapter 0, attached to Chapter IV, is more than 200 pages.

Grothendieck never gave permission for the 2nd edition of EGA I to be republished, so copies are rare but found in many libraries. The work on EGA was finally disrupted by Grothendieck's departure first from IHÉS in 1970 and soon afterwards from the mathematical establishment altogether.

In historical terms, the development of the EGA approach set the seal on the application of sheaf theory to algebraic geometry, set in motion by Serre's basic paper FAC. It also contained the first complete exposition of the algebraic approach to differential calculus, via principal parts. The foundational unification it proposed (see for example unifying theories in mathematics) has stood the test of time.

EGA has been scanned by NUMDAM and is available at their website under "Publications mathématiques de l'IHÉS", volumes 4 (EGAI), 8 (EGAII), 11 (EGAIII.1re), 17 (EGAIII.2e), 20 (EGAIV.1re), 24 (EGAIV.2e), 28 (EGAIV.3e) and 32 (EGAIV.4e).

== Bibliographic information ==
- Grothendieck, Alexandre; Dieudonné, Jean (1971). Éléments de géométrie algébrique: I. Le langage des schémas. Grundlehren der Mathematischen Wissenschaften (in French). Vol. 166 (2nd ed.). Berlin; New York: Springer-Verlag. ISBN 978-3-540-05113-8.
- Grothendieck, Alexandre; Dieudonné, Jean (1960). "Éléments de géométrie algébrique: I. Le langage des schémas". Publications Mathématiques de l'IHÉS. 4: 5–228. doi:10.1007/bf02684778. MR 0217083.
- Grothendieck, Alexandre; Dieudonné, Jean (1961). "Éléments de géométrie algébrique: II. Étude globale élémentaire de quelques classes de morphismes". Publications Mathématiques de l'IHÉS. 8: 5–222. doi:10.1007/bf02699291. MR 0217084.
- Grothendieck, Alexandre; Dieudonné, Jean (1961). "Eléments de géométrie algébrique: III. Étude cohomologique des faisceaux cohérents, Première partie". Publications Mathématiques de l'IHÉS. 11: 5–167. doi:10.1007/bf02684274. MR 0217085.
- Grothendieck, Alexandre; Dieudonné, Jean (1963). "Éléments de géométrie algébrique: III. Étude cohomologique des faisceaux cohérents, Seconde partie". Publications Mathématiques de l'IHÉS. 17: 5–91. doi:10.1007/bf02684890. MR 0163911.
- Grothendieck, Alexandre; Dieudonné, Jean (1964). "Éléments de géométrie algébrique: IV. Étude locale des schémas et des morphismes de schémas, Première partie". Publications Mathématiques de l'IHÉS. 20: 5–259. doi:10.1007/bf02684747. MR 0173675.
- Grothendieck, Alexandre; Dieudonné, Jean (1965). "Éléments de géométrie algébrique: IV. Étude locale des schémas et des morphismes de schémas, Seconde partie". Publications Mathématiques de l'IHÉS. 24: 5–231. doi:10.1007/bf02684322. MR 0199181.
- Grothendieck, Alexandre; Dieudonné, Jean (1966). "Éléments de géométrie algébrique: IV. Étude locale des schémas et des morphismes de schémas, Troisième partie". Publications Mathématiques de l'IHÉS. 28: 5–255. doi:10.1007/bf02684343. MR 0217086.
- Grothendieck, Alexandre; Dieudonné, Jean (1967). "Éléments de géométrie algébrique: IV. Étude locale des schémas et des morphismes de schémas, Quatrième partie". Publications Mathématiques de l'IHÉS. 32: 5–361. doi:10.1007/bf02732123. MR 0238860.

== See also ==
- Fondements de la Géometrie Algébrique (FGA)
- Séminaire de Géométrie Algébrique du Bois Marie (SGA)
