= Doctrine (mathematics) =

In mathematics, specifically category theory, a doctrine is roughly a system of theories ("categorical analogues of fragments of logical theories which have sufficient category-theoretic structure for their models to be described as functors"). For example, an algebraic theory, as invented by William Lawvere, is an example of a doctrine. The concept of doctrines was invented by Lawvere as part of his work on algebraic theories. The name is based on a suggestion by Jon Beck.

A doctrine can be defined in several ways:

- as a 2-monad. This was Lawvere's original approach.
- as a 2-category; the idea is that each object there amounts to a "theory".
- As cartesian double theories, as logics, or as a class of limits.

== See also ==
- Categorical logic
- Pseudomonad
