= Indexed category =

In category theory, a branch of mathematics, a C-indexed category is a pseudofunctor from C^{op} to Cat, where Cat is a 2-category of categories. Any indexed category has an associated Grothendieck construction, which gives rise to a fibred category.
