= Cohomological descent =

Derived descent

In algebraic geometry, a cohomological descent is, roughly, a "derived" version of a fully faithful descent in the classical descent theory. This point is made precise by the below: the following are equivalent: in an appropriate setting, given a map a from a simplicial space X to a space S,

- $a^*: D^+(S) \to D^+(X)$ is fully faithful.
- The natural transformation $\operatorname{id}_{D^+(S)} \to Ra_* \circ a^*$ is an isomorphism.

The map a is then said to be a morphism of cohomological descent.

The treatment in SGA uses a lot of topos theory. Conrad's notes gives a more down-to-earth exposition.

== See also ==
- hypercovering, of which a cohomological descent is a generalization
