= Monoid (disambiguation) =

A monoid is an algebraic structure.

Monoid may also refer to:

- Monoid (category theory), a mathematical structure used in category theory
- Monoid, a race of one-eyed creatures in the 1966 Doctor Who serial The Ark
