= Monadic descent =

In mathematics, especially category theory, a monadic descent is roughly an idea to encode descent data using a monad.

== Bénabou-Roubaud theorem ==
The Bénabou-Roubaud theorem says that (roughly) given a bifibration satisfying the Beck–Chevalley condition for p, the category of descent data is canonically equivalent to the category of algebras of the monad induced by $p_!, p^*$.

== See also ==
- Beck's monadicity theorem
