= Internal category =

Generalization of a small category

In mathematics, more specifically in category theory, internal categories are a generalization of the notion of a small category, and are defined with respect to a fixed ambient category. If the ambient category is taken to be the category of sets then one recovers the theory of small categories. In general, internal categories consist of a pair of objects in the ambient category—thought of as the 'object of objects' and 'object of morphisms'—together with a collection of morphisms in the ambient category satisfying certain identities. Group objects are common examples of internal categories.

There are notions of internal functors and natural transformations that make the collection of internal categories in a fixed category into a 2-category.

== Definitions ==
Let $C$ be a category with pullbacks. An internal category in $C$ consists of the following data: two $C$-objects $C_0,C_1$ named "object of objects" and "object of morphisms" respectively and four $C$-arrows $d_0,d_1:C_1\rightarrow C_0, e:C_0\rightarrow C_1,m:C_1\times_{C_0}C_1\rightarrow C_1$ subject to coherence conditions expressing the axioms of category theory. See .

== See also ==
- Enriched category
- Double category
