= Polyad (mathematics) =

Generalization of monads in category theory

In mathematics, polyad is a concept of category theory introduced by Jean Bénabou in generalising monads. A polyad in a bicategory D is a bicategory morphism Φ from a locally punctual bicategory C to D, Φ : C → D. (A bicategory C is called locally punctual if all hom-categories C(X,Y) consist of one object and one morphism only.) Monads are polyads Φ : C → D where C has only one object.

== Bibliography ==
- Street, Ross (1983), "Enriched Categories and Cohomology", Quaestiones Mathematicae, 6 (1–3): 265–283, doi:10.1080/16073606.1983.9632304
  - Street, Ross (2005) [1983], "Enriched categories and cohomology" (PDF), Reprints in Theory and Applications of Categories, 14: 1–18
- Leinster, Tom (1999). "Generalized Enrichment for Categories and Multicategories". arXiv:math/9901139.
- Garner, Richard; Shulman, Michael (2016). "Enriched categories as a free cocompletion". Advances in Mathematics. 289: 1–94. arXiv:1301.3191. doi:10.1016/j.aim.2015.11.012.
