= Michèle Raynaud =

French mathematician

- Born: Michèle Chaumartin; 9 January 1938 (age 88); France
- Education: Paris Diderot University
- Scientific career
- Fields: Mathematics
- Doctoral advisor: Alexander Grothendieck

Michèle Raynaud (born Michèle Chaumartin; January 9, 1938) is a French mathematician, who works on algebraic geometry and who worked with Alexandre Grothendieck in Paris in the 1960s at the Institut des hautes études scientifiques (IHÉS).

== Biography ==
Raynaud was a member of the séminaire de géométrie algébrique du Bois Marie (SGA) 1 and 2 and obtained her doctorate in 1972, supervised by Grothendieck at Paris Diderot University. Her thesis was entitled Théorèmes de Lefschetz en cohomologie cohérente et en cohomologie étale. Grothendieck wrote about her doctoral thesis in Récoltes et Semailles (p.168 Chapitre 8.1.) describing it as original, entirely independent, and a major work.

Michèle Raynaud married mathematician Michel Raynaud who was also a member of the Grothendieck school.

== Publications ==
- Théorèmes de Lefschetz en cohomologie cohérente et en cohomologie étale, Bull. Soc. Math. France, Memoirs Nr. 41, 1975
- Théorèmes de Lefschetz en cohomologie étale des faisceaux en groupes non nécessairement commutatifs. C. R. Acad. Sci. Paris Sér. A-B 270 1970
- Théorème de représentabilité relative sur le foncteur de Picard
- Schémas en groupes. Séminaire de l'Institut des Hautes Etudes Scientifiques
- Grothendieck, Alexander; Raynaud, Michèle (2003) [1971], Revêtements étales et groupe fondamental (SGA 1), Documents Mathématiques (Paris) [Mathematical Documents (Paris)], vol. 3, Paris: Société Mathématique de France, arXiv:math/0206203, Bibcode:2002math......6203G, ISBN 978-2-85629-141-2, MR 2017446
- Grothendieck, Alexander; Raynaud, Michèle (2005) [1968], Séminaire de Géométrie Algébrique du Bois Marie - 1962 - Cohomologie locale des faisceaux cohérents et théorèmes de Lefschetz locaux et globaux - (SGA 2), Documents Mathématiques (Paris), vol. 4, Paris: Société Mathématique de France, arXiv:math/0511279, Bibcode:2005math.....11279G, ISBN 978-2-85629-169-6, MR 2171939
