= Modification (mathematics) =

In mathematics, specifically category theory, a modification is an arrow between natural transformations. It is a 3-cell in the 3-category of 2-cells (where the 2-cells are natural transformations, the 1-cells are functors, and the 0-cells are categories). The notion is due to Bénabou.

Given two natural transformations $\boldsymbol{\alpha,\, \beta} : \boldsymbol{\mathbf{F}} \rightarrow \boldsymbol{\mathbf{G}}$, there exists a modification $\boldsymbol{\mathbf{\mu}} : \boldsymbol{\mathbf{\alpha}} \rightarrow \boldsymbol{\mathbf{\beta}}$ such that:

- $\boldsymbol{\mathbf{\mu_a}} : \boldsymbol{\mathbf{\alpha_a}} \rightarrow \boldsymbol{\mathbf{\beta_a}}$,
- $\boldsymbol{\mathbf{\mu_b}} : \boldsymbol{\mathbf{\alpha_b}} \rightarrow \boldsymbol{\mathbf{\beta_b}}$, and
- $\boldsymbol{\mathbf{\mu_f}} : \boldsymbol{\mathbf{\alpha_f}} \rightarrow \boldsymbol{\mathbf{\beta_f}}$.

The following commutative diagram shows an example of a modification and its inner workings.

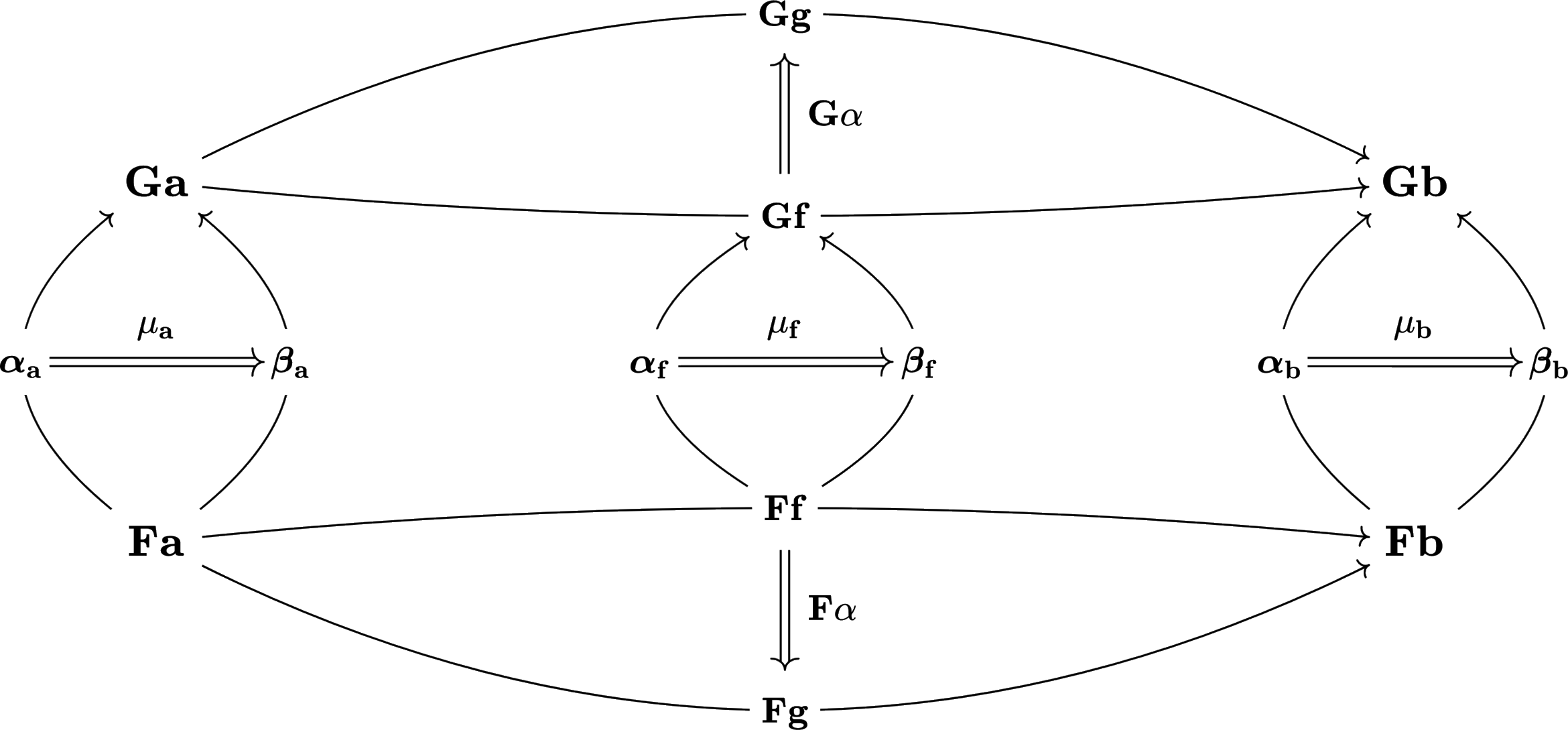
An example of a modification in category theory.
