= Conservative functor =

In category theory, a branch of mathematics, a conservative functor is a functor $F: C \to D$ such that for any morphism $f$ in $C$, $F(f)$ being an isomorphism implies that $f$ is an isomorphism.

== Examples ==
The forgetful functors in algebra, such as from Grp to Set, are conservative. More generally, every monadic functor is conservative. In contrast, the forgetful functor from Top to Set is not conservative because not every continuous bijection is a homeomorphism.

Every faithful functor from a balanced category is conservative.
