= Coherency (homotopy theory) =

Standard that diagrams must satisfy up to isomorphism

In mathematics, specifically in homotopy theory and (higher) category theory, coherency is the standard that equalities or diagrams must satisfy when they hold "up to homotopy" or "up to isomorphism".

Often, more than one way of defining a mapping between mathematical objects might be considered "natural". Then the question might arise, which way to choose? Coherency implies that it doesn't matter which way is chosen, because all the alternative definitions are equivalent. The equivalence is often manifest in a commutative diagram.

The adjectives such as "pseudo-" and "lax-" are used to refer to the fact equalities are weakened in coherent ways; e.g., pseudo-functor, pseudoalgebra.

== Coherent isomorphism ==
In some situations, isomorphisms need to be chosen in a coherent way. Often, this can be achieved by choosing canonical isomorphisms. But in some cases, such as prestacks, there can be several canonical isomorphisms and there might not be an obvious choice among them.

In practice, coherent isomorphisms arise by weakening equalities; e.g., strict associativity may be replaced by associativity via coherent isomorphisms. For example, via this process, one gets the notion of a weak 2-category from that of a strict 2-category.

Replacing coherent isomorphisms by equalities is usually called strictification or rectification.

=== Weak 2-category ===
In a weak 2-category the composition of 1-morphisms does not satisfy associativity as an equation, however for each triple $A \mathrel{\stackrel f \longrightarrow} B \mathrel{\stackrel g \longrightarrow} C \mathrel{\stackrel h \longrightarrow} D$, there are 2-morphisms

in $\mathcal{B} (A,D)$ this is called associativity coherence isomorphisms.

For each 1-cell $A \mathrel{\stackrel f \longrightarrow} B$, isomorphism

in $\mathcal{B} (A,B)$ this is called unit coherence isomorphisms.

== Coherence condition ==
A coherence condition is a collection of conditions requiring that various compositions of elementary morphisms are equal. Typically the elementary morphisms are part of the data of the category and the coherence conditions appear as conditions in definitions. A coherence theorem states that, in order to be assured that all these equalities hold, it suffices to check a small number of identities.

Part of the data of a monoidal category is a chosen morphism $\alpha_{A,B,C}$, called the associator:

$$\alpha_{A,B,C} \colon (A\otimes B)\otimes C \rightarrow A\otimes(B\otimes C)$$

for each triple of objects $A, B, C$ in the category. Using compositions of these $\alpha_{A,B,C}$, one can construct a morphism

$$( ( A_N \otimes A_{N-1} ) \otimes A_{N-2} ) \otimes \cdots \otimes A_1) \rightarrow ( A_N \otimes ( A_{N-1}  \otimes \cdots \otimes ( A_2 \otimes A_1) ).$$

Actually, there are many ways to construct such a morphism as a composition of various $\alpha_{A,B,C}$. One coherence condition that is typically imposed is that these compositions are all equal.

Typically one proves a coherence condition using a coherence theorem, which states that one only needs to check a few equalities of compositions in order to show that the rest also hold. In the above example, one only needs to check that, for all quadruples of objects $A,B,C,D$, the following diagram commutes.

Any pair of morphisms from $( ( \cdots ( A_N \otimes A_{N-1} ) \otimes \cdots ) \otimes A_2 ) \otimes A_1)$ to $( A_N \otimes ( A_{N-1} \otimes ( \cdots \otimes ( A_2 \otimes A_1) \cdots ) )$ constructed as compositions of various $\alpha_{A,B,C}$ are equal.

=== Beck–Chevalley condition ===
The Beck–Chevalley condition is a coherence condition relating adjoint functors associated with a commutative square of categories. It states that, under suitable assumptions, two canonical ways of transporting information around the square coincide up to a natural isomorphism. The condition appears throughout category theory, especially in the theory of fibrations, toposes, indexed categories, descent theory, categorical logic, and algebraic geometry. It is named after Jonathan Mock Beck and Claude Chevalley.

=== Further examples ===
Two simple examples that illustrate the definition are as follows. Both are directly from the definition of a morphism on ordinarily category.

==== Identity ====
Let f : A → B be a morphism of a category containing two objects A and B. Associated with these objects are the identity morphisms 1_{A} : A → A and 1_{B} : B → B. By composing these with f, we construct two morphisms:

f o 1_{A} : A → B, and
1_{B} o f : A → B.

Both are morphisms between the same objects as f. We have, accordingly, the following coherence statement:

f o 1_{A} = f = 1_{B} o f.

==== Associativity of composition ====
Let f : A → B, g : B → C and h : C → D be morphisms of a category containing objects A, B, C and D. By repeated composition, we can construct a morphism from A to D in two ways:

(h o g) o f : A → D, and
h o (g o f) : A → D.

We have now the following coherence statement:

(h o g) o f = h o (g o f).

In these two particular examples, the coherence statements are theorems for the case of an abstract category, since they follow directly from the axioms; in fact, they are axioms. For the case of a concrete mathematical structure, they can be viewed as conditions, namely as requirements for the mathematical structure under consideration to be a concrete category, requirements that such a structure may meet or fail to meet.

== Coherence theorem ==
Mac Lane's coherence theorem states, roughly, that if diagrams of certain types commute, then diagrams of all types commute. A simple proof of that theorem can be obtained using the permutoassociahedron, a polytope whose combinatorial structure appears implicitly in Mac Lane's proof.

There are several generalizations of Mac Lane's coherence theorem. Each of them has the rough form that "every weak structure of some sort is equivalent to a stricter one". A coherence theorem theorem for weak 4-categories does not yet exist.

== Homotopy coherence ==
=== example ===
- The quasicategories give a model for ∞-categories where diagrams are automatically homotopy coherent.

=== Vogt’s theorem ===
Let A be a small category and $B_s$ a locally Kan and complete (or co-complete) S-category.

Vogt’s theorem on coherent diagrams one has an equivalence of categories

$\mathrm{Ho}(B^A ) \simeq \mathrm{Coh}(A,B_s).$

== See also ==
- Canonical isomorphism
- 2-category
- Pseudoalgebra
- Tricategory
- Associativity isomorphism
