= Double category =

Generalization of a category

In mathematics, especially category theory, a double category is a generalization of a category where instead of morphisms, we have vertical morphisms, horizontal morphisms and 2-morphisms. Introduced by Ehresmann in 1960s, the notion may be compared with that of a bicategory; namely, the notion of a bicategory is obtained by enrichment, while the notion of a double category is obtained by internalization. Precisely, a double category is a category internal to Cat (roughly meaning a category object).

Just as iterating the process of obtaining the notion of a 2-category leads to that of an n-category, iterating the process for a double category leads to that of an n-fold category.

== Definitions ==
Double categories can be understood as being made from the following data

- A class of objects
- A class of vertical morphisms between objects
- A class of horizontal morphisms between objects
- A class of 2-morphisms between horizontal morphisms filling in squares

In this presentation both the vertical and horizontal morphisms give a category structure to the objects. These categories are called edge categories.
