= Interchange law =

Mathematical law

In mathematics, specifically category theory, the interchange law (or exchange law) regards the relationship between vertical and horizontal compositions of natural transformations.

== Discussion ==
Let $\mathbf{F,\, G,\, H} : \mathbb{C} \longrightarrow \mathbb{D}$ and $\mathbf{\bar{F},\, \bar{G},\, \bar{H}} : \mathbb{D} \longrightarrow \mathbb{E}$ where $\mathbf{F,\, G,\, H,\, \bar{F},\, \bar{G},\, \bar{H}}$ are functors and $\mathbb{C},\, \mathbb{D},\, \mathbb{E}$ are categories. Also, let $\boldsymbol{\alpha} : \mathbf{F \longrightarrow G}$ and $\boldsymbol{\beta} : \mathbf{G \longrightarrow H}$ while $\boldsymbol\bar\alpha : \mathbf{\bar{F} \longrightarrow \bar{G}}$ and $\boldsymbol\bar\beta : \mathbf{\bar{G} \longrightarrow \bar{H}}$ where $\boldsymbol\alpha,\, \boldsymbol\beta,\, \boldsymbol\bar\alpha,\, \boldsymbol\bar\beta$ are natural transformations. For simplicity's and this article's sake, let $\boldsymbol\bar\alpha$ and $\boldsymbol\bar\beta$ be the "secondary" natural transformations and $\boldsymbol\alpha$ and $\boldsymbol\beta$ the "primary" natural transformations. Given the previously mentioned, we have the interchange law, which says that the horizontal composition ($\circ$) of the primary vertical composition ($\bullet$) and the secondary vertical composition ($\bullet$) is equal to the vertical composition ($\bullet$) of each secondary-after-primary horizontal composition ($\circ$); in short, $(\bar{\boldsymbol{\beta}}\ \bullet\ \bar{\boldsymbol{\alpha}}) \circ\ ({\boldsymbol{\beta}}\ \bullet\ {\boldsymbol{\alpha}})\ = (\bar{\boldsymbol{\beta}}\ \circ\ {\boldsymbol{\beta}})\ \bullet\ (\bar{\boldsymbol{\alpha}}\ \circ\ {\boldsymbol{\alpha}})$. It also appears in monoidal categories wherein classical composition ($\circ$) and the tensor product ($\otimes$) take their places in lieu of the horizontal composition and vertical composition partnership and is denoted $(g \circ f) \otimes (j \circ h) = (g \otimes j) \circ (f \otimes h)$.

The word "interchange" stems from the observation that the compositions and natural transformations on one side are switched or "interchanged" in comparison to the other side. The entire relationship can be shown within the following diagram.

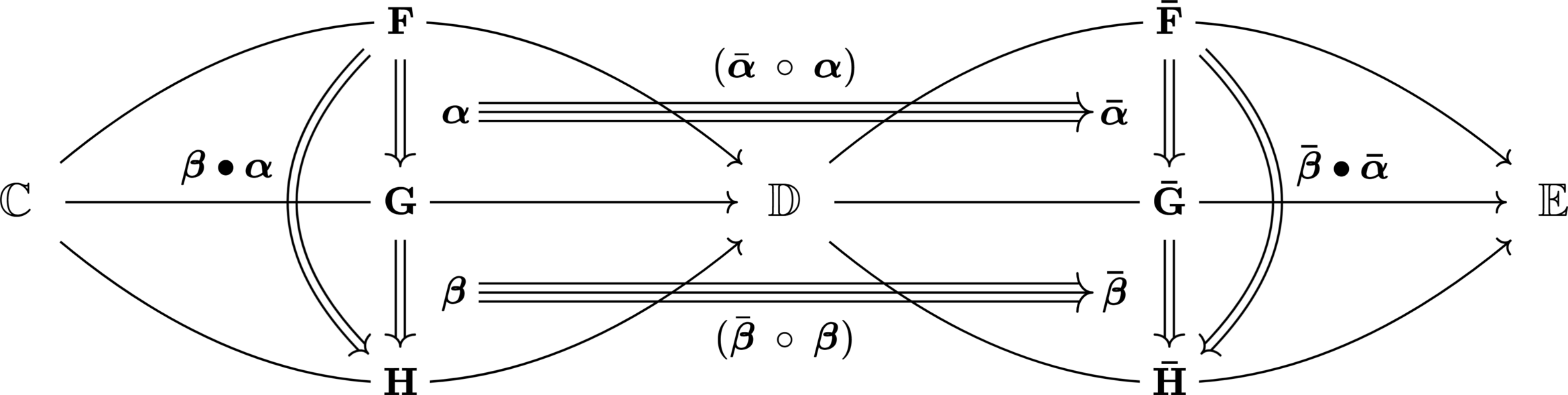
The interchange law in category theory.

If we apply this context to functor categories, and observe natural transformations $\boldsymbol{\alpha} : \mathbf{F \longrightarrow G}$ and $\boldsymbol{\beta} : \mathbf{G \longrightarrow H}$ within a category $V$ and $\boldsymbol\bar\alpha : \mathbf{\bar{F} \longrightarrow \bar{G}}$ and $\boldsymbol\bar\beta : \mathbf{\bar{G} \longrightarrow \bar{H}}$ within a category $W$, we can imagine a functor $\Gamma : V \longrightarrow W$, such that

the natural transformations are mapped like such:

- $\Gamma(\boldsymbol{\alpha}) \longrightarrow \boldsymbol{\bar{\alpha}},\,$
- $\Gamma(\boldsymbol{\beta}) \longrightarrow \boldsymbol{\bar{\beta}},\,$
- and $\Gamma(\boldsymbol\beta\ \bullet\ \boldsymbol\alpha) \longrightarrow (\boldsymbol\bar\beta\ \bullet\ \boldsymbol\bar\alpha)$;

functors are also mapped accordingly:

- $\Gamma(\boldsymbol{\mathbf{F}}) \longrightarrow (\boldsymbol{\mathbf{\bar{F}}}),\,$
- $\Gamma(\boldsymbol{\mathbf{G}}) \longrightarrow (\boldsymbol{\mathbf{\bar{G}}}),\,$
- and $\Gamma(\boldsymbol{\mathbf{H}}) \longrightarrow (\boldsymbol{\mathbf{\bar{H}}})$.

== Examples ==
- Let $\sigma' \circ \sigma$ be the matrix product of matrices $\sigma', \sigma$ and $\tau \cdot \sigma$ the matrix given by

$$\begin{bmatrix}
\tau & \, \\
\, & \sigma
\end{bmatrix}$$
. Then the pair $\circ, \cdot$ satisfies the interchange law.

- Let $G$ be a toplogical groups and for loops $\alpha, \beta$ on $G$, let $\beta \circ \alpha$ be the concatenation of two loops and $\beta \cdot \alpha$ the pointwise product; i.e., $(\beta \cdot \alpha)(t) = \beta(t) \alpha(t)$. Then the interchange law holds for $\circ, \cdot$.

The Eckmann–Hilton argument states the following surprising fact: let $S$ be a set and suppose it is a monoid in two ways: there are two binary operations $*, \cdot$. If the two identities $e_\cdot = e_*$ are the same and if the interchange law holds for $*, \cdot$, then $\cdot = *$ and the common operation is commutative.
