= Publications Mathématiques de l'IHÉS =

- Discipline: Mathematics
- Language: English
- Edited by: Sébastien Boucksom

Publication details
- History: 1959–present
- Publisher: Springer Science+Business Media on behalf of the Institut des Hautes Études Scientifiques
- Frequency: Biannually
- Impact factor: 3.500 (2021)

Standard abbreviations
- ISO 4: Publ. Math. IHÉS
- MathSciNet: Publ. Math. Inst. Hautes Études Sci.

Indexing
- ISSN: 0073-8301 (print); 1618-1913 (web)

Links
- Journal homepage

Publications Mathématiques de l'IHÉS is a peer-reviewed mathematical journal. It is published by Springer Science+Business Media on behalf of the Institut des Hautes Études Scientifiques, with the help of the Centre National de la Recherche Scientifique. The journal was established in 1959 and was published at irregular intervals, from one to five volumes a year. It is now biannual. The editor-in-chief is Sébastien Boucksom (CNRS, Institut de Mathématique de Jussieu).

== See also ==
- Annals of Mathematics
- Journal of the American Mathematical Society
- Inventiones Mathematicae
- Acta Mathematica
