= Beck's monadicity theorem =

Theorem in category theory

In category theory, a branch of mathematics, Beck's monadicity theorem gives a criterion that characterises monadic functors, introduced by Jonathan Mock Beck (1968). It is often stated in dual form for comonads. It is sometimes called the Beck tripleability theorem because of the older term triple for a monad.

Beck's monadicity theorem asserts that a functor

$$U: C \to D$$

is monadic if and only if

1. U has a left adjoint;
2. U reflects isomorphisms (if U(f) is an isomorphism then so is f); and
3. C has coequalizers of U-split parallel pairs (those parallel pairs of morphisms in C, which U sends to pairs having a split coequalizer in D), and U preserves those coequalizers.

There are several variations of Beck's theorem: if U has a left adjoint then any of the following conditions ensure that U is monadic:

- U reflects isomorphisms and C has coequalizers of reflexive pairs (those with a common right inverse) and U preserves those coequalizers. (This gives the crude monadicity theorem.)
- Every diagram in C which is by U sent to a split coequalizer sequence in D is itself a coequalizer sequence in C. In different words, U creates (preserves and reflects) U-split coequalizer sequences.

Another variation of Beck's theorem characterizes strictly monadic functors: those for which the comparison functor is an isomorphism rather than just an equivalence of categories. For this version the definitions of what it means to create coequalizers is changed slightly: the coequalizer has to be unique rather than just unique up to isomorphism.

Beck's theorem is particularly important in its relation with the descent theory, which plays a role in sheaf and stack theory, as well as in the Alexander Grothendieck's approach to algebraic geometry. Most cases of faithfully flat descent of algebraic structures (e.g. those in FGA and in SGA1) are special cases of Beck's theorem. The theorem gives an exact categorical description of the process of 'descent', at this level. In 1970 the Grothendieck approach via fibered categories and descent data was shown (by Jean Bénabou and Jacques Roubaud) to be equivalent (under some conditions) to the comonad approach. In a later work, Pierre Deligne applied Beck's theorem to Tannakian category theory, greatly simplifying the basic developments.

Linton's monadicity theorem: Let $\mathcal A$ be a category that has kernel pairs of retractions, and let $\mathcal C$ be a category that has kernel pairs and coequalizers. Let $U: \mathcal C \rightarrow \mathcal A$ be functor. When $\mathcal A = \textbf{Set}$, $U$ is monadic if and only if

1. $U$ has a left adjoint;
2. $U$ preserves and reflects regular epimorphisms; and
3. $(f, g)$ is kernel pair if and only if $(U_f, U_g)$ is kernel pair.

Linton (1969) proved this theorem in a more general category, requiring it to be a category $\mathcal A$ in which every epimorphism splits.

== Examples ==
- The forgetful functor from topological spaces to sets is not monadic as it does not reflect isomorphisms: continuous bijections between (non-compact or non-Hausdorff) topological spaces need not be homeomorphisms.
- Negrepontis (1971, §1) shows that the functor from commutative C*-algebras to sets sending such an algebra A to the unit ball, i.e., the set $\{a \in A, \|a\| \le 1 \}$, is monadic. Negrepontis also deduces Gelfand duality, i.e., the equivalence of categories between the opposite category of compact Hausdorff spaces and commutative C*-algebras can be deduced from this.
- The powerset functor from Set^{op} to Set is monadic, where Set is the category of sets. More generally Beck's theorem can be used to show that the powerset functor from T^{op} to T is monadic for any topos T, which in turn is used to show that the topos T has finite colimits.
- The forgetful functor from semigroups to sets is monadic. This functor does not preserve arbitrary coequalizers, showing that some restriction on the coequalizers in Beck's theorem is necessary if one wants to have conditions that are necessary and sufficient.
- If B is a faithfully flat commutative ring over the commutative ring A, then the functor T from A modules to B modules taking M to B⊗_{A}M is comonadic. This follows from the dual of Beck's theorem, as the condition that B is flat implies that T preserves finite limits, while the condition that B is faithfully flat implies that T reflects isomorphisms. A coalgebra over T turns out to be essentially a B-module with descent data, so the fact that T is comonadic is equivalent to the main theorem of faithfully flat descent, saying that B-modules with descent are equivalent to A-modules.
