= Fondements de la Géometrie Algébrique =

Mathematics book

- Author: Alexander Grothendieck
- Publisher: Secrétariat Mathématique

Fondements de la Géometrie Algébrique (FGA) is a book that collected together seminar notes of Alexander Grothendieck. It is an important source for his pioneering work on scheme theory, which laid foundations for algebraic geometry in its modern technical developments. The title is a translation of the title of André Weil's book Foundations of Algebraic Geometry. It contained material on descent theory, and existence theorems including that for the Hilbert scheme. The Technique de descente et théorèmes d'existence en géometrie algébrique is one series of seminars within FGA.

Like the bulk of Grothendieck's work of the IHÉS period, duplicated notes were circulated, but the publication was not as a conventional book.

== Contents ==
These are Séminaire Bourbaki notes, by number, from the years 1957 to 1962.

- Fondements de la géométrie algébrique. Commentaires [Séminaire Bourbaki, t. 14, 1961/62, Complément];
- Théorème de dualité pour les faisceaux algébriques cohérents [Séminaire Bourbaki, t. 9, 1956/57, no. 149]; (coherent duality)
- Géométrie formelle et géométrie algébrique [Séminaire Bourbaki, t. 11, 1958/59, no. 182]; (formal geometry)
- Technique de descente et théorèmes d'existence en géométrie algébrique. I-VI
  - I. Généralités. Descente par morphismes fidèlement plats [Séminaire Bourbaki, t. 12, 1959/60, no. 190];
  - II. Le théorème d'existence en théorie formelle des modules [Séminaire Bourbaki, t. 12, 1959/60, no. 195];
  - III. Préschémas quotients [Séminaire Bourbaki, t. 13, 1960/61, no. 212];
  - IV. Les schémas de Hilbert [Séminaire Bourbaki, t. 13, 1960/61, no. 221];
  - V. Les schémas de Picard. Théorèmes d'existence [Séminaire Bourbaki, t. 14, 1961/62, no. 232];
  - VI. Les schémas de Picard. Propriétés générales [Séminaire Bourbaki, t. 14, 1961/62, no. 236]

== See also ==
- Éléments de géométrie algébrique
- Séminaire de Géométrie Algébrique du Bois Marie
