= Pasting theorem =

In higher category theory in mathematics, the pasting theorem guarantees that each pasting diagram has a uniquely defined composite that independent of the order of the vertical composite, as long as they are defined. Namely, such a cell is well-defined the several different sequences of compositions which the diagram could be explained as representing yield the same cell.

Operation of pasting appeared in Bénabou (1967) when introducing weak 2-category. The pasting theorem for strict 2-category guarantees that every 2-categorical pasting scheme defines a unique composite 2-cell in every 2-category, this is proved by Power (1990). For weak 2-category it is proved in Appendix A of Verity (1992)'s thesis as a consequence of the coherence theorem for weak 2-category. The pasting theorem for strict n-category was proved by Johnson (1989) and Power (1991), but the definition of the pasting scheme used in that proof is different.

== Example for operation of pasting ==
For the example, consider pasting diagram D for the triangle identity of an adjunction

2-cell $\mathcal{E} : g \circ f \rightarrow \mathrm{id}_A$, $\eta : \mathrm{id}_B \rightarrow f \circ g$

The entire pasting diagram represents the vertical composite $(\mathrm{id}_f * \mathcal{E})(\eta * \mathrm{id}_f)$ which is a 2-cell in D(A, B), this is the right-hand side of the diagram.

If a diagram in a 2-category were to be a 2-graph morphism from some 2-graph (that is 2-globular set) into the underlying 2-graph of the 2-category, then in the left-hand side of above pasting diagram, it would not be a "diagram" (in the sense of Johnson), that is, a cell drawn on a diagram it is may not defined as a composite of other cells.

Specifically, the codomain of $\eta * \mathrm{id}_f$ and domain of $\mathrm{id}_f * \mathcal{E}$ of the vertical composite $(\mathrm{id}_f * \mathcal{E})(\eta * \mathrm{id}_f)$ do not equal:

$\mathrm{id}_B \circ f \mathrel{\stackrel {\eta*\mathrm{id}_f} \longrightarrow} (f \circ g) \circ f \mathrel{\stackrel {\rho} \longrightarrow} f \circ (g \circ f) \mathrel{\stackrel {\mathrm{id}_f * \mathcal{E}} \longrightarrow} f \circ \mathrm{id}_A$.

The pasting theorem guarantees that irrespective of how $\rho$ is taken, the vertical composite $(\mathrm{id}_f * \mathcal{E})(\eta * \mathrm{id}_f)$ is uniquely defined.

2-cell $\alpha : a \rightarrow c \circ b$, $\beta : b \rightarrow e \circ d$, $\gamma : f \circ c \rightarrow g$, $\delta : h \circ g \circ e \rightarrow i$, $\epsilon : k \rightarrow j \circ h$

The above pasting diagram is a vertical composite of horizontal composites of 2-cells of the form:

Operation of pasting in a 2-category, another problem is the need to show that composite of vertical and horizontal composite of 2-cells are unique irrespective of the order of composition. This was proven by Power (1990).

== Pasting theorem for 2-category ==
=== Anchored graph ===
Suppose $G$ and $H$ are anchored graphs such that:

- $s_G = s_H$,
- $t_G = t_H$, and
- $\mathrm{cod}_G = \mathrm{dom}_H$.

The vertical composite $HG$ is the anchored graph defined by the following data:

(1) The connected plane graph of $HG$ is the quotient

$$\frac{G \sqcup H} {\{\mathrm{cod}_G = \mathrm{dom}_H\}}$$

of the disjoint union of $G$ and $H$, with the codomain of $G$ identified with the domain of $H$.

(2) The interior faces of $HG$ are the interior faces of $G$ and $H$, which are already anchored.

(3) The exterior face of $HG$ is the intersection of $\mathrm{ext}_G$ and $\mathrm{ext}_H$, with

- source $s_G = s_H$,
- sink $t_G = t_H$,
- domain $\mathrm{dom}_G$, and
- codomain $\mathrm{cod}_H$.

=== 2-pasting scheme ===
A 2-pasting scheme is an anchored graph G together with a decomposition

$G = G_n \cdots G_1$

into vertical composites of $n \geq 1$ atomic graphs $G_1, \dots ,G_n$.

=== 2-pasting diagram ===
Suppose $A$ is a 2-category, and $G$ is an anchored graph. A $G$-diagram in $A$ is an assignment $\phi$ as follows.

- $\phi$ assigns to each vertex $v$ in $G$ an object $\phi_v$ in $A$.
- $\phi$ assigns to each edge $e$ in $G$ with tail $u$ and head $v$ a 1-cell $\phi_e \in A(\phi_u, \phi_v)$.

For a directed path $P = v_0 e_1 v_1 \dots e_m v_m$ in $G$ with $m \leq 1$, define the horizontal composite 1-cell $\phi_P = \phi_{e_m} \cdots \phi_{e_1} \in A(\phi_{v_0}, \phi_{v_m})$.

- $\phi$ assigns to each interior face $F$ of $G$ a 2-cell $\phi_{F} : \phi_{\mathrm{dom}_F} \rightarrow \phi_{\mathrm{cod}_F}$ in $A(\phi_{s_F}, \phi_{t_F})$.

If $G$ admits a pasting scheme presentation, then a $G$-diagram is called a 2-pasting diagram in $A$ of shape $G$.

=== Statement ===
Pasting theorem for strict 2-category: every 2-pasting diagram in an strict 2-category has a unique composite.

Pasting theorem for weak 2-category: every 2-pasting diagram in an weak 2-category has a unique composite.

== Pasting theorem for Gray-category ==
Every 2-dimensional pasting diagram in a Gray-category has a unique composition up to a contractible groupoid of choices.

== Pasting theorem for strict n-category (ver. Power (1991)) ==
Weak version of pasting theorem for strict n-category: for any positive natural number n, every labelled n-pasting scheme in an strict n-category $A$ has a unique "strong composite".

Pasting theorem for strict n-category: for every positive natural number n, every labelled n-pasting scheme in an strict n-category $A$ has a unique "n-pasting composite".
