= Jonathan Mock Beck =

American mathematician (1935–2006)

Jonathan Mock "Jon" Beck (November 11, 1935 – March 11, 2006, Somerville, Massachusetts) was an American mathematician, who worked on category theory and algebraic topology.

== Career ==
Beck received his PhD in 1967 under Samuel Eilenberg at Columbia University. Beck was a faculty member of the mathematics department of Cornell University and of the University of Puerto Rico. He is known for the eponymous Beck's tripleableness (monadicity) theorem and the Beck–Chevalley condition.

== Publications ==
- Beck, J. (1969). "On H-spaces and infinite loop spaces". Category Theory, Homology Theory and their Applications. Lecture Notes in Mathematics. Vol. III. pp. 139–153. doi:10.1007/BFb0081961. ISBN 978-3-540-04618-9.
- Beck, Jonathan Mock (2003) [1967], "Triples, algebras and cohomology" (PDF), Reprints in Theory and Applications of Categories, Columbia University PhD thesis, 2: 1–59, MR 1987896
- Beck, Jonathan Mock (2025) [1968]. "The tripleableness theorem" (PDF). Reprints in Theory and Applications of Categories. 31: 1–11.
