= Descent (mathematics) =

Mathematical concept that extends the intuitive idea of gluing in topology

In mathematics, the idea of descent extends the intuitive idea of 'gluing' in topology. Since the topologists' glue is the use of equivalence relations on topological spaces, the theory starts with some ideas on identification.

== Descent of vector bundles ==
The case of the construction of vector bundles from data on a disjoint union of topological spaces is a straightforward place to start.

Suppose X is a topological space covered by open sets X_{i}. Let Y be the disjoint union of the X_{i}, so that there is a natural mapping

$$p: Y \rightarrow X.$$

We think of Y as 'above' X, with the X_{i} projection 'down' onto X. With this language, descent implies a vector bundle on Y (so, a bundle given on each X_{i}), and our concern is to 'glue' those bundles V_{i}, to make a single bundle V on X. What we mean is that V should, when restricted to X_{i}, give back V_{i}, up to a bundle isomorphism.

The data needed is then this: on each overlap

$$X_{ij},$$

intersection of X_{i} and X_{j}, we'll require mappings

$$f_{ij}: V_i \rightarrow V_j$$

to use to identify V_{i} and V_{j} there, fiber by fiber. Further the f_{ij} must satisfy conditions based on the reflexive, symmetric and transitive properties of an equivalence relation (gluing conditions). For example, the composition

$$f_{jk} \circ f_{ij} = f_{ik}$$

for transitivity (and choosing apt notation). The f_{ii} should be identity maps and hence symmetry becomes $f_{ij}=f^{-1}_{ji}$ (so that it is fiberwise an isomorphism).

These are indeed standard conditions in fiber bundle theory (see transition map). One important application to note is change of fiber : if the f_{ij} are all you need to make a bundle, then there are many ways to make an associated bundle. That is, we can take essentially same f_{ij}, acting on various fibers.

Another major point is the relation with the chain rule: the discussion of the way there of constructing tensor fields can be summed up as "once you learn to descend the tangent bundle, for which transitivity is the Jacobian chain rule, the rest is just 'naturality of tensor constructions'".

To move closer towards the abstract theory we need to interpret the disjoint union of the

$$X_{ij}$$

now as

$$Y \times_X Y,$$

the fiber product (here an equalizer) of two copies of the projection p. The bundles on the X_{ij} that we must control are V_{i} and V_{j}, the pullbacks to the fiber of V via the two different projection maps to X.

Therefore, by going to a more abstract level one can eliminate the combinatorial side (that is, leave out the indices) and get something that makes sense for p not of the special form of covering with which we began. This then allows a category theory approach: what remains to do is to re-express the gluing conditions.

== History ==
The ideas were developed in the period 1955–1965 (which was roughly the time at which the requirements of algebraic topology were met but those of algebraic geometry were not). From the point of view of abstract category theory the work of comonads of Beck was a summation of those ideas; see Beck's monadicity theorem.

The difficulties of algebraic geometry with passage to the quotient are acute. The urgency (to put it that way) of the problem for the geometers accounts for the title of the 1959 Grothendieck seminar TDTE on theorems of descent and techniques of existence (see FGA) connecting the descent question with the representable functor question in algebraic geometry in general, and the moduli problem in particular.

== Fully faithful descent ==
Let $p:X' \to X$. Each sheaf F on X gives rise to a descent datum

$$(F' = p^* F, \alpha: p_0^* F' \simeq p_1^* F'), \, p_i: X'' = X' \times_X X' \to X'$$,

where $\alpha$ satisfies the cocycle condition

$$p_{02}^* \alpha = p_{12}^* \alpha \circ p_{01}^* \alpha, \, p_{ij}: X' \times_{X} X' \times_{X} X' \to X' \times_{X} X'$$.

The fully faithful descent says: The functor $F \mapsto (F', \alpha)$ is fully faithful. Descent theory tells conditions for which there is a fully faithful descent, and when this functor is an equivalence of categories.

== See also ==
- Grothendieck connection
- Stack (mathematics)
- Galois descent
- Grothendieck topology
- Fibered category
- Beck's monadicity theorem
- Cohomological descent
- Faithfully flat descent
- Monadic descent
