= Monoid (category theory) =

Mathematical concept in category theory

In category theory, a branch of mathematics, a monoid (or monoid object, or internal monoid, or algebra) $(M, \mu, \eta)$ in a monoidal category $(\mathcal C,\otimes,I)$ is an object $M$ together with two morphisms

- $\mu\colon M\otimes M\to M$ called multiplication,
- $\eta\colon I\to M$ called unit,

such that the pentagon diagram

and the unitor diagram

commute. In the above notation, $1$ is the identity morphism of $M$, $I$ is the unit element and $\alpha,\lambda$ and $\rho$ are respectively the associator, the left unitor and the right unitor of the monoidal category $\mathcal C$.

Dually, a comonoid in a monoidal category $\mathcal C$ is a monoid in the dual category $\mathcal C^{\mathrm{op}}$.

Suppose that the monoidal category $\mathcal C$ has a braiding $\gamma$. A monoid $M$ in $\mathcal C$ is commutative when $\mu\circ\gamma=\mu$.

== Examples ==
- A monoid object in Set, the category of sets (with the monoidal structure induced by the Cartesian product), is a monoid in the usual sense. In this context:
  - the unit object $I$ of the monoidal category can be taken to be any singleton.
  - the multiplication $\mu$ corresponds to the monoid operation in the usual sense.
  - the unit $\eta$ corresponds to the function that maps the single member of $I$ to the identity element in the monoid.
- A monoid object in Top, the category of topological spaces (with the monoidal structure induced by the product topology), is a topological monoid.
- A monoid object in the category of monoids (with the direct product of monoids) is just a commutative monoid. This follows easily from the Eckmann–Hilton argument.
- A monoid object in the category of complete join-semilattices Sup (with the monoidal structure induced by the Cartesian product) is a unital quantale.
- A monoid object in (Ab, ⊗_{Z}, Z), the category of abelian groups, is a ring.
- For a commutative ring R, a monoid object in
  - (R-Mod, ⊗_{R}, R), the category of modules over R, is a R-algebra.
  - the category of graded modules is a graded R-algebra.
  - the category of chain complexes of R-modules is a differential graded algebra.
- A monoid object in K-Vect, the category of K-vector spaces (again, with the tensor product), is a unital associative K-algebra, and a comonoid object is a K-coalgebra.
- For any category C, the category [C, C] of its endofunctors has a monoidal structure induced by the composition and the identity functor I_{C}. A monoid object in [C, C] is a monad on C.
- For any category with a terminal object and finite products, every object becomes a comonoid object via the diagonal morphism Δ_{X} : X → X × X. Dually in a category with an initial object and finite coproducts every object becomes a monoid object via id_{X} ⊔ id_{X} : X ⊔ X → X.

== Categories of monoids ==
Given two monoids (M, μ, η) and (M′, μ′, η′) in a monoidal category C, a morphism f : M → M′ is a morphism of monoids when

- f ∘ μ = μ′ ∘ (f ⊗ f),
- f ∘ η = η′.

In other words, the following diagrams

,

commute.

The category of monoids in C and their monoid morphisms is written Mon_{C}.

== See also ==
- Act-S, the category of monoids acting on sets
