= Pseudo-functor =

Category mapping

In mathematics, a pseudofunctor F is a mapping from a category to the category Cat of (small) categories that is just like a functor except that $F(f \circ g) = F(f) \circ F(g)$ and $F(1) = 1$ do not hold as exact equalities but only up to coherent isomorphisms.

A typical example is an assignment to each pullback $Ff = f^*$, which is a contravariant pseudofunctor since, for example for a quasi-coherent sheaf $\mathcal{F}$, we only have: $(g \circ f)^* \mathcal{F} \simeq f^* g^* \mathcal{F}.$

Since Cat is a 2-category, more generally, one can also consider a pseudofunctor between 2-categories, where coherent isomorphisms are given as invertible 2-morphisms.

The Grothendieck construction associates to a contravariant pseudofunctor a fibered category, and conversely, each fibered category is induced by some contravariant pseudofunctor. Because of this, a contravariant pseudofunctor, which is a category-valued presheaf, is often also called a prestack (a stack minus effective descent).

== Definition ==
A pseudofunctor F from a category C to Cat consists of the following data

- a category $F(x)$ for each object x in C,
- a functor $Ff$ for each morphism f in C,
- a set of coherent isomorphisms for the identities and the compositions; namely, the invertible natural transformations
  $$F(f \circ g) \simeq F f \circ Fg$$,
  $F(\operatorname{id}_x) \simeq \operatorname{id}_{F(x)}$ for each object x

such that

$F(fgh) \overset{\sim}\to F(fg) Fh \overset{\sim}\to Ff Fg Fh$ is the same as $F(fgh) \overset{\sim}\to Ff F(gh) \overset{\sim}\to Ff Fg Fh$,
$F (\operatorname{id}_x) \circ Ff \overset{\sim}\to F(\operatorname{id}_x \circ f) = Ff$ is the same as $F (\operatorname{id}_x) \circ Ff \simeq \operatorname{id}_{F(x)} \circ Ff = Ff$,
and similarly for $Ff \circ F (\operatorname{id}_x)$.

== Higher category interpretation ==
The notion of a pseudofunctor is more efficiently handled in the language of higher category theory. Namely, given an ordinary category C, we have the functor category as the ∞-category

$$\textbf{Fct}(C, \textbf{Cat}).$$

Each pseudofunctor $C \to \textbf{Cat}$ belongs to the above, roughly because in an ∞-category, a composition is only required to hold weakly, and conversely (since a 2-morphism is invertible).

== See also ==
- Lax functor
